= Funky Miracle =

1991 compilation album by The Meters

Compilation album by The Meters
- Released: 1991
- Recorded: 1968–1977
- Genre: Funk
- Label: Charly
- Producer: Allen Toussaint, Marshall Sehorn

The Meters chronology
| Good Old Funky Music (1990) | Funky Miracle (1991) | Uptown Rulers: The Meters live on the Queen Mary (1992) |

Professional ratings
Review scores
| Source | Rating |
|---|---|
| Allmusic | 3/5 stars |

Funky Miracle is a compilation album from the funk group The Meters on the Charly Records label, containing re-issued material mainly from their first three albums with Josie Records: The Meters (1969), Look-Ka Py Py (1969) and Struttin' (1970). In fact, 35 of the 36 tracks from these albums are present on Funky Miracle with only "Wichita Lineman" from Struttin' missing.

== Track listing ==
Track list adapted from Discogs.

Disc 1
| No. | Title | Length |
|---|---|---|
| 1. | "Look-Ka Py Py" | 3:15 |
| 2. | "9 Till 5" | 2:45 |
| 3. | "Cissy Strut" | 3:00 |
| 4. | "I Need More Time" | 3:10 |
| 5. | "Pungee" | 2:38 |
| 6. | "Ease Back" | 2:35 |
| 7. | "Cardova" | 4:30 |
| 8. | "Yeah You're Right" | 2:41 |
| 9. | "Tippi-Toes" | 2:26 |
| 10. | "Chicken Strut" | 2:48 |
| 11. | "Sassy Lady" | 2:34 |
| 12. | "Little Old Money Maker" | 2:38 |
| 13. | "Rigor Mortis" | 2:35 |
| 14. | "Live Wire" | 2:35 |
| 15. | "A Message from the Meters" | 2:42 |
| 16. | "Hey! Last Minute" | 2:59 |
| 17. | "This is my Last Affair" | 2:50 |
| 18. | "Darling Darling Darling" | 2:53 |
| 19. | "Go for yourself" | 3:10 |

Disc 2
| No. | Title | Length |
|---|---|---|
| 1. | "Sophisticated Cissy" | 2:50 |
| 2. | "Here Comes the Meterman" | 2:40 |
| 3. | "The Mob" | 2:44 |
| 4. | "Funky Miracle" | 2:25 |
| 5. | "Ride Your Pony" | 3:19 |
| 6. | "Art" | 2:30 |
| 7. | "Dry Spell" | 2:27 |
| 8. | "Thinking" | 1:38 |
| 9. | "Handclapping Song" | 2:55 |
| 10. | "Britches" | 2:50 |
| 11. | "Liver Splash" | 2:40 |
| 12. | "Joog" | 2:12 |
| 13. | "Same Old Thing" | 2:52 |
| 14. | "6V6 LA" | 2:20 |
| 15. | "Sehorns Farm" | 2:25 |
| 16. | "Sing a Simple Song" | 2:56 |
| 17. | "Stormy" | 3:34 |
| 18. | "Ann" | 2:40 |
| 19. | "Oh, Calcutta!" | 2:45 |

== Personnel ==
Credits adapted from AllMusic.

Primary artist

- Ziggy Modeliste – drums, vocals
- Art Neville – keyboards, vocals
- Leo Nocentelli – guitar, background vocals
- George Porter Jr. – bass, background vocals
