= The Best of The Meters =

Compilation album by The Meters
- Released: 1975
- Genre: Funk
- Length: 36:13
- Label: Mardi Gras; B000005XF2
- Producer: Allen Toussaint, Marshall Sehorn

The Meters chronology
Fire On The Bayou (1975)	The Best of The Meters (1975)	Trick Bag (1976)

Professional ratings
Review scores
Source	Rating
Allmusic	3/5 stars

The Best of the Meters is a compilation album by the funk group The Meters released in 1975. All tracks had been previously released as singles.

== Track listing ==
No.	Title	Original release	Length
1.	"Cissy Strut"	from The Meters	3:06
2.	"Here Comes the Meter Man"	from The Meters	2:59
3.	"Sophisticated Cissy"	from The Meters	2:57
4.	"Look-Ka Py Py"	from Look-Ka Py Py	3:20
5.	"Funky Miracle"	from Look-Ka Py Py	2:30
6.	"Chicken Strut"	from Struttin'	2:47
7.	"Tippi-Toes"	from Struttin'	2:28
8.	"Good Old Funky Music"	Josie 1031A	2:23
9.	"Yeah, You're Right"	from Look-Ka Py Py	2:46
10.	"They All Ask'd for You"	Sansu 1014A	4:12
11.	"Mardi Gras Mambo"	Sansu 1015A	2:39
12.	"Hey Pocky A-Way"	Sansu 1014B	4:06

== Personnel ==
Credits adapted in part from AllMusic.

- Art Neville – composer, keyboards, vocals
- Ziggy Modeliste – composer, drums, vocals
- Leo Nocentelli – composer, guitar, background vocals
- George Porter Jr. – composer, bass, background vocals
- Cyril Neville – composer, drums, percussion, vocals
- Allen Toussaint – producer
- Marshall Sehorn – producer
- Jeff Hannusch – liner notes
