= Cabbage Alley =

Studio album by the Meters
- Released: May 11, 1972
- Genre: Funk; reggae
- Length: 47:10
- Label: Reprise
- Producer: Allen Toussaint; Marshall Sehorn

The Meters chronology
Struttin' (1970)	Cabbage Alley (1972)	Rejuvenation (1974)

Singles from Cabbage Alley
- 1. "Cabbage Alley" Released: 1972; 2. "Do the Dirt" Released: 1972

Cabbage Alley is the fourth studio album by the American funk group the Meters, produced by Allen Toussaint and Marshall Sehorn and released in May 1972 by Reprise Records. It was the band's first album for the label, following the demise of Josie Records a year earlier. The signing afforded the group a higher recording budget and re-introduced organist and keyboardist Art Neville to the lineup, having briefly left the band some time earlier.

The Meters used the album to explore a variety of musical styles, including reggae, rock and boogaloo, while retaining the group's distinctive second line-based, syncopated funk style. The music is softer and jammier than the group's earlier records and also sees them increase the use of chants and vocals, particularly from Neville, marking a further departure from the group's instrumental beginnings. The group also incorporated then-popular studio effects like tape delay and phasing. The album is named for a then-recently demolished back alley in the group's native New Orleans which had been a centre for the city's second line funk music, while the surrealist album sleeve was inspired by the art of René Magritte

The title track and "Do the Dirt" were issued as singles. On release, Cabbage Alley received wide acclaim from music critics, some of whom deemed it the group's best album yet. Despite the reviews and the album's smoother sound, it was a commercial disappointment, which was partly attributed to Reprise's poor marketing. The album has been re-released several times, including by Sundazed Music in 2000.

== Background and recording ==
Active since the 1960s, the Meters were regarded as leaders in authentic New Orleans funk, with a danceable, rhythmic sound characterised by the second line syncopation of drummer Zigaboo Modeliste and bassist George Porter Jr., complemented by organist and keyboardist Art Neville and riff-oriented guitarist Leo Nocentelli. By 1972, the group had achieved several R&B hits in the United States with danceable instrumentals, but spent much of their time as the house band for Allen Toussaint and Marshall Sehorn's production company Sansu Enterprises. As the group's single "Chicken Strut" (1970) was rising in popularity, Neville acrimoniously exited the band due to an inter-band dispute regarding whether to sign with Otis Redding's manager, Phil Walden.

In 1971, the Meters' label Josie Records went bankrupt, leaving the group with substantial unpaid royalties. According to Porter Jr, Sehorn–serving as the group's manager–negotiated a deal to sign the Meters with a bigger label, Reprise Records, a subsidiary of Warner Bros. Records. The deal necessitated that Neville return to the group. Porter Jr later reflected: "For the band, it was a good move [for Neville to rejoin]. We’re getting ready to go to a better label, get a better budget for recording and stuff." The move from Josie to Reprise did not compromise the Meters' relationship with Sansu, as they retained Toussaint as producer and Sehon as manager.

The group's first album for Reprise, Cabbage Alley was produced by Toussaint and Sehorn, and unlike their earlier albums, the band recorded it in their own sessions, "instead of on the tail end of somebody else's," as described by Cliff White of Blues & Soul. According to Let It Rock writer Pete Wingfield, Toussaint approached Cabbage Alley as a companion project to his own album Life, Love and Faith (1972), further noting that the musician hoped the release of both records through Warner labels would revive interest in soul music in New Orleans and attract a white audience to the city's musicians, as well as "putting an identifiable N.O. sound back in the charts." However, in a 1974 NME interview with Roger St. Pierre, Neville said that while Toussaint and Sehorn are credited for producing their albums, the production work was taken by the Meters themselves, adding: "Toussaint and Sehorn don't even come into the studio while we're recording but they do get involved in the final mix and so on."

== Composition ==
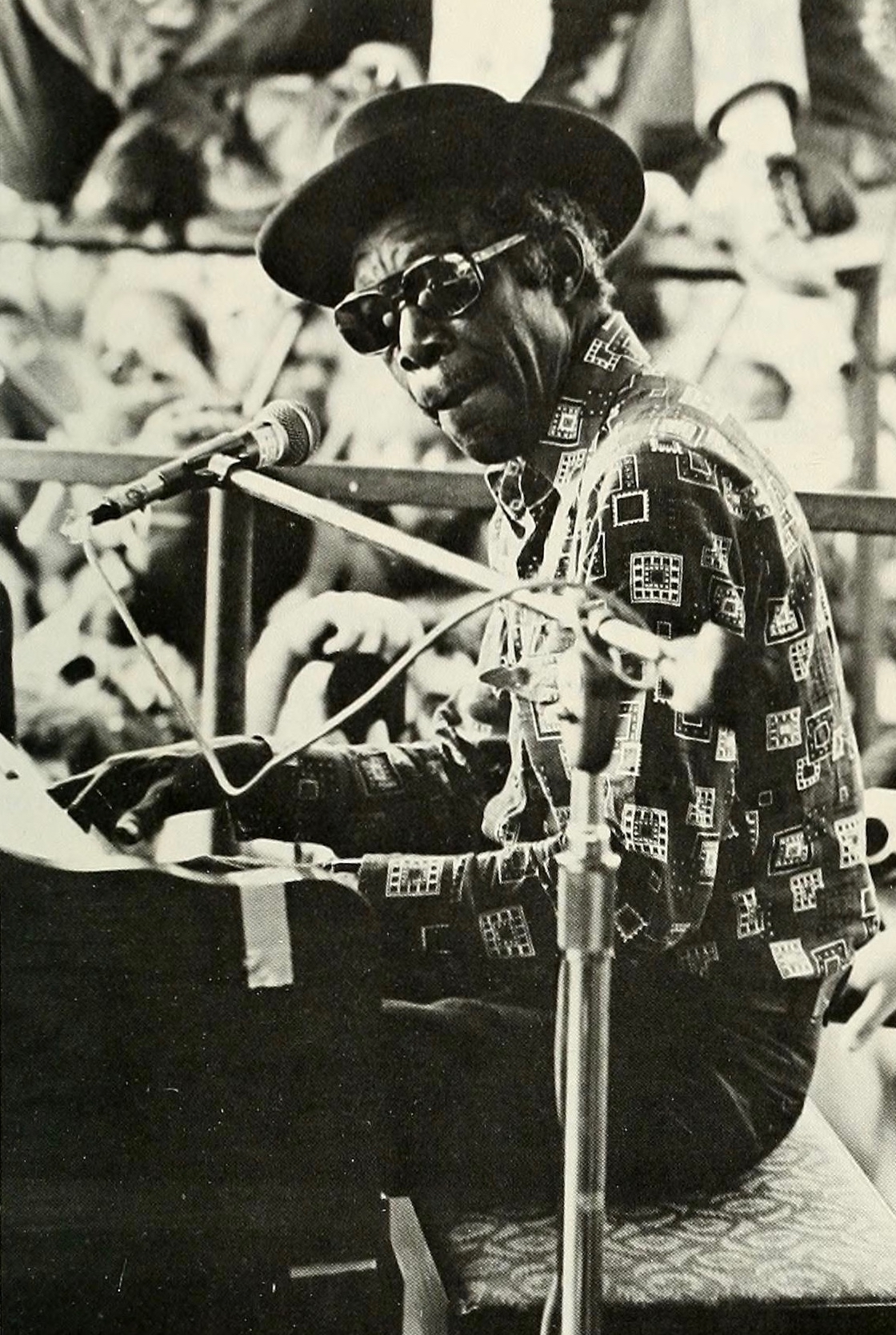
The title track is based on "Hey Now Baby" by Professor Longhair (pictured).

While rooted in dance-oriented funk with second line syncopation, Cabbage Alley also sees the group explore a wider array of musical styles than on previous albums. Bob Palmer wrote that the album features several prominently reggae-style tracks, in addition to "generous helpings of the more fashionable second line and its bastard child boogaloo", while music writer John Laycock that while the Meters are known for rhythm and blues, the record's music more closely resembles the reggae of Desmond Dekker than "New Orleans stalwarts such as Fats Domino or Dr. John." The album is also slicker, jammier and funkier than the group's earlier recordings, and continues to move them away from their all-instrumental beginnings by increasing the use of Neville's vocals, with a higher total of tracks with vocals than instrumentals. The band also experimented with several then-popular studio effects, such as phasing, echo and delay.

The change in direction is immediately evident with the distorted guitar riff that begins the opening song "You’ve Got to Change (You’ve Got to Reform)", a dance track with a lengthy jam section. "Stay Away" is a delve into progressive rock, and is stretched out by unusual electronic experimentation, and tape delay. A cover of a Neil Young song, "Birds" is an exercise in smooth soul, while "The Flower Song" and "Smilin'" are instrumentals which have been compared to the music of Booker T. & the MGs. "Soul Island" was inspired by the band's trip to Trinidad, where they performed with the Mighty Sparrow, and was considered by Palmer to be the group's most reggae-like song to that point, citing the "chunk-a-chunk bass and guitar unisons and basic organ lead" for melodically and texturally evoking "the music of the Islands." Idris Walter of Sounds deemed it a "New Orleans reggae" song with similarities to Unit 4 + 2's hit "Concrete and Clay" (1965).

A "chunky dance novelty", "Do the Dirt" has a similar aesthetic and instrumentation to "Soul Island" but slides into a "North American soul groove" during the bridges. Written by Nocentelli, the rock-oriented "Lonesome and Unwanted" is sung by Neville and built around a chant-aided hook. The album's title track "Cabbage Alley" was inspired in part by Professor Longhair's "Hey Now Baby", which was recorded around 1950 but not released until earlier in 1972. The song is characterised by Neville's rolling piano and, according to Joe McEwen of The Real Paper, "a stuttering rhythm track two years ahead of its time." Louder Than War writer Craig Chaligne wrote that the track showed the group's increasing confidence in vocal arrangements. Neville felt that listeners from outside New Orleans would not "understand" the song, noting that it "has the Dixieland heritage, the second line feeling, even more than anything else we've written. If you born here, you just gonna have it, that's all."

== Release and reception ==
Cabbage Alley was released in the US by Reprise in May 1972, and was also the group's first album released in the United Kingdom, issued to coincide with their tour of the country. The title track and "Do the Dirt" were both released as singles. The record was named for a small back street in New Orleans that had been recently demolished to make way for a football stadium. Described by Timothy Crouse as "the poor black's version of Bourbon Street", the site was a centre for the city's uplifting second line funk music. According to Lionel Batiste Sr. of Treme Brass Band: "Cabbage Alley was around Perdido Street. They had a lot of musicians down there—it was almost like a [red light] district—fast women. Near the battlefield." Designed by John Echevarrieta, the album cover is based on a variation of René Magritte's 1952 painting The Listening Room, which itself had been reproduced on the sleeve of the Jeff Beck Group's Beck-Ola (1969). According to authors Angie Errigo and Steve Leaning, "Both pictures are Surrealist in the incongruous, claustrophobic propinquity of two equally convincing, yet texturally antithetical realities."

Cabbage Alley received wide acclaimed by music critics, with many describing as the band's best album yet. Writing favourably in Rolling Stone, Bob Palmer praised Modeliste's drumming for imparting "more rhythmic variety to every bar than any American soul group has yet employed", and the rest of the group for "often [doubling] on auxiliary percussion, resulting in a percussive complexity that is both a new and natural direction." He added that even the album's weaker songs contain some of "the rhythmic vitality and emerging roots-consciousness that looks like the most important new development in the black popular music of the Seventies." The Windsor Star writer John Laycock described the album as "nice enough and interesting in a record-scholar's way" and highlighted its similarity to reggae. Juan Rodriguez of The Montreal Star deemed it "a good dancing record, if you play it real loud and, as James Brown says, con-cen-trate." They wrote that the sound is thick and funky and the group can be forgiven for "[overdoing] it sometimes", while praising the combination of the band and Toussaint's production for resulting in a unique record.

=== Commercial response ===
Despite the album's strong reviews, smoother sound, and the move to a major label, Cabbage Alley and its two singles were commercial disappointments. The album reached number 48 on the Billboard Top Soul LPs chart, but unlike the group's first two records, it missed the Billboard Top LPs and Tape chart. Arthur Neville told an interviewer for Blues & Soul that he believed the album should have had stronger exposure, "because everyone agrees that the material is the strongest we have ever done."

While the group blamed the poor sales on a lack of promotion, St. Pierre believes the album underperformed because it "was somewhat devoid of memorable melodic content – relying simply on basic riffs", believing this to be a stylistic change which "happened a bit too quickly for their fans." White believes the poor sales suggested that "the rest of America (and naturally Europe) had long lost its appetite for New Orleans music", noting that even musicians from the city had turned to exploring broader sounds, while James Lien of CMJ New Music Monthly believes the wider public "didn't click" with Cabbage Alley or the Meters' later album Fire on the Bayou (1975) because "they were peppered with so many obscure references to local New Orleans culture that folks who didn't know about Mardi Gras or red beans and rice just couldn't pick up on it." Chaligne writes that the failure was partly attributed to "Reprise's inability to market a band that had few similarities with the rest of its roster." Despite the disappointment, Cabbage Alley led to the Meters working on Dr. John's popular "Right Place, Wrong Time" (1973) and taking a European tour in mid-1973 with Dr. John and Professor Longhair.

== Legacy and retrospective reviews ==
Professional ratings
Review scores
Source	Rating
AllMusic	3/5 stars
Christgau's Record Guide	B
The Encyclopedia of Popular Music	4/5 stars
Funk (Dave Thompson)	8/10

Cabbage Alley was re-released in the UK in 1975 by Warner. The album and its follow-ups Rejuvenation (1974) and Fire on the Bayou (1975) were further re-released in 2000 by Sundazed Music, a label specializing in reissues of 1960s and 70s "classic recordings", with liner notes by John Swenson. Further reissues of the record were by Reprise in 2001, Hi Horse Records in 2009, Music on Vinyl in 2013 and WEA Japan in 2014. Some re-releases include both parts of "Chug Chug Chug-a-Lug (Push and Shove)" as bonus tracks.

Reviewing the 1975 reissue, Peter Harvey of Record Mirror wrote that the album showcased the group's early sound which was earthier and "closer to the street" than they had become, and highlighted "Lonesome and Unwanted People" and four other tracks, concluding that the album is "fresh, spontaneous sounding, and naturally made for dancing." In The Real People, Joe McEwen called Cabbage Alley a "largely (and unfortunately) ignored album", while Billboard referred to it as a "great" debut for Reprise that "saw the band branch out with more chants and Neville's soulful vocalizing." Dave Thompson noted that while the group "[rewrapped] their trademark sound in some of the modern studio's favorite toys," the title track ensured the group did not "move too far off base". Josh Terry of Vinyl Me, Please said that while vocals were more prominent, "the grooves were still there — anchored with a Caribbean flavor from a trip to Trinidad and Tobago". He also noted that while the Meters tentatively incorporated pop elements into the album's jams, they "perfected" the pop aspect on Rejuvenation.

Less impressed, Stephen Thomas Erlewine of AllMusic wrote that Cabbage Alley was less gritty than the band's previous works, finding them "sacrificing feel for texture", and complained that the group had no memorable songs to adapt to their new style. He qualified this by saying that while the Meters had "gotten a little softer than necessary", it remained pleasurable to hear a "remarkably sympathetic, supple group" play. In Christgau's Record Guide (1981), critic Robert Christgau questioned whether the album's stylistic variation, or ambiguity, hinted at an identity crisis for the band. In The Encyclopedia of Popular Music (1997), writer Colin Larkin notes that Cabbage Alley began a series of "critically acclaimed albums" for the Meters that "reinforced their distinctive, sinewy rhythms." Terry Perkins of St. Louis Post-Dispatch wrote that Cabbage Alley and its two follow-ups "clearly mark the band's high point as a unit", and further highlighted "Gettin' Funkier All the Time", while Steve MacQueen of Tallahassee Democrat recommended them alongside "Cissy Strut" (1969) for defining the group's "stripped-down, choppy, syncopated funk style of the early 70s". In a 2015 interview, Adam Horovitz of the Beastie Boys called Cabbage Alley the "maddest" find in his record collection.

== Track listing ==
Side one

No.	Title	Writer(s)	Length
1.	"You've Got to Change (You've Got to Reform)"	Ziggy Modeliste, Leo Nocentelli	5:15
2.	"Stay Away"	Nocentelli	5:22
3.	"Birds"	Neil Young	4:23
4.	"The Flower Song"	Nocentelli	4:51
5.	"Soul Island"	Modeliste, Art Neville, Nocentelli, George Porter Jr.	3:10

Side two

No.	Title	Writer(s)	Length
6.	"Do the Dirt"	Nocentelli	2:36
7.	"Smiling"	Neville	3:09
8.	"Lonesome and Unwanted People"	Nocentelli	4:39
9.	"Gettin' Funkier All the Time"	Modeliste, Nocentelli, Porter	3:19
10.	"Cabbage Alley"	Neville	3:30

2001 CD bonus tracks

No.	Title	Writer(s)	Length
11.	"Chug Chug Chug-A-Lug (Push and Shove) Part I"	Modeliste, Nocentelli	3:30
12.	"Chug Chug Chug-A-Lug (Push and Shove) Part II"	Modeliste, Nocentelli	3:26

== Personnel ==
Adapted from the liner notes of Cabbage Alley

- Ziggy Modeliste – drums, cowbell, gourd, wood block
- Art Neville – organ, tambourine; vocals (tracks 3, 6, 8)
- Leo Nocentelli – guitar, tambourine
- George Porter, Jr – bass
- Cyril Neville – congas
- Squirell – congas

Production

- Tim Livingston – project manager
- Bunny Matthews – liner notes
- Barry Hansen – liner notes
- Bob Irwin – mastering
- Al Quaglieri – mastering
- Rich Russell – design
- Ed Thrasher – art direction
- David Willardson – cover art
