= Uptown Rulers: The Meters live on the Queen Mary =

Live album by The Meters
- Released: 1992
- Recorded: March 24, 1975
- Genre: Funk
- Length: 59:21:00
- Label: Rhino
- Producer: Allen Toussaint, Marshall Sehorn

The Meters chronology
New Directions (1977)	Uptown Rulers: The Meters live on the Queen Mary (1992)	Funkify Your Life: The Meters Anthology (1995)

Professional ratings
Review scores
Source	Rating
Allmusic	4/5 stars

Uptown Rulers: The Meters live on the Queen Mary is a live album by the funk group The Meters recorded on March 24, 1975. It was recorded at the Venus and Mars album release party hosted by Linda and Paul McCartney on board the Queen Mary ship. It captures the band's live sound at their peak in the mid 1970s. It is the only live recording of the band from that period.

== Track listing ==
No.	Title	Writer(s)	Length
1.	"Gary Owens introduces the band"	—	0:38
2.	"Fire on the Bayou"	The Meters, Cyril Neville	7:09
3.	"Africa"	The Meters	4:32
4.	"It Ain't No Use"	The Meters	10:34
5.	"Make It with You"	David Gates	6:32
6.	"Cissy Strut / Cardova / It's Your Thing / Love the One You're With"	The Meters, Isley Brothers, Stephen Stills	10:42
7.	"Art Neville addresses the audience"	—	1:38
8.	"Rockin' Pneumonia and the Boogie Woogie Flu / Something You Got / I Know (You Don't Love Me No More) / Everybody Loves a Lover"	Huey Smith, Chris Kenner, Barbara George, Robert Allen, Richard Adler	6:10
9.	"Liar"	Russ Ballard	4:57
10.	"Mardi Gras Mambo"	The Meters, Cyril Neville (originally by The Hawketts)	2:48
11.	"Hey Pocky A-Way"	The Meters	3:41

== Personnel ==
Credits adapted from AllMusic, with cover songwriter credits.

The Meters

- Arthur Neville – keyboards, vocals
- Leo Nocentelli – guitar, vocals
- Ziggy Modeliste – drums, vocals
- Cyril Neville – percussion, vocals
- George Porter Jr. – bass, vocals

Production

- Allen Toussaint – producer
- Marshall Sehorn – producer
