= Zony Mash =

Compilation album by The Meters
- Released: 2003
- Recorded: 1968–1971
- Genre: Funk
- Length: 37:04:00
- Labels: Sundazed; B0000BXBYF
- Producers: Allen Toussaint, Marshall Sehorn

The Meters chronology
Fiyo at the Fillmore, Vol. 1 (2003)	Zony Mash (2003)

Professional ratings
Review scores
Source	Rating
Allmusic	3/5 stars
Paste	Positive

Zony Mash is an album of vintage rarities and non-album B-sides by the funk group The Meters. The album consists of 13 tracks of the band's early works with Josie Records from 1968 to 1971. Eight tracks were originally released as singles, and five tracks were released as bonus tracks on re-issue albums.

== Reception ==
In a review in AllMusic, Richie Unterberger wrote, "On both vocal and instrumental numbers, the band offers first-rate tight yet rubbery funk-soul." He noted stylistic influences and similarities to the music of the era and added "it's more the Meters' own funkified brand of New Orleans R&B than anything else." Steve LaBate of Paste magazine had a positive view and said the album captures the band's sound in their heyday.

The Zony Mash Beer Project, a microbrewery and event space in New Orleans, is named in honor of the album.

== Track listing ==
All tracks are written by The Meters, except as noted.

No.	Title	Writer(s)	Length
1.	"Zony Mash"		3:00
2.	"I Need More Time"	Leo Nocentelli	3:15
3.	"The Look of Love"	Burt Bacharach, Hal David	3:36
4.	"A Message from the Meters"	Leo Nocentelli	2:42
5.	"Stretch Your Rubber Band"	Leo Nocentelli	2:43
6.	"Soul Machine"		3:30
7.	"Doodle-Oop (The World Is a Bit Under the Weather)"	Leo Nocentelli, Vincent Toussaint	2:36
8.	"Good Old Funky Music"		2:21
9.	"Sassy Lady"		2:40
10.	"Borro"		2:13
11.	"Groovy Lady"	Ziggy Modeliste, Leo Nocentelli	2:45
12.	"Meter Strut"		2:56
13.	"Funky Meters Soul"		2:47

== Personnel ==
Credits adapted from AllMusic.

Primary artist

- Ziggy Modeliste – composer, drums, vocals
- Art Neville – composer, keyboards, vocals
- Leo Nocentelli – composer, guitar, background vocals
- George Porter Jr. – composer, bass guitar, background vocals

Production

- Allen Toussaint – producer
- Marshall Sehorn – producer
- Tim Livingston – project manager
- Efram Turchick – project manager
- Rodney Mills – engineer
- Bob Irwin – mastering
- Al Quaglieri – mastering
- Stephanie Kennedy – project coordinator
- Eric Schou – design
- Jeff Smith – design
