= Southern Nights (Allen Toussaint album) =

Studio album by Allen Toussaint
- Released: May 1975
- Recorded: 1975
- Studio: Sea Saint, New Orleans
- Genre: New Orleans rhythm and blues; psychedelic soul
- Length: 35:43
- Label: Reprise
- Producer: Allen Toussaint; Marshall Sehorn

Allen Toussaint chronology
Life, Love and Faith (1972)	Southern Nights (1975)	Motion (1978)

Singles from Southern Nights
- 1. "Country John/When the Party's Over" Released: May 1975; 2. "Southern Nights/Out of the City" Released: May 1975

Southern Nights is a concept album by American singer, songwriter, and producer Allen Toussaint, released in May 1975. Seminal to the development of New Orleans rhythm and blues, the album draws on funk and soul styles while "flirting with neo-psychedelia". Two singles were released in support of the album, "Country John" backed with "When the Party's Over" and "Southern Nights" backed with "Out of the City". Although neither single charted, Glen Campbell's cover of the title track would top Billboard's country, pop and adult contemporary charts in 1977. Released in May 1975 by Reprise Records, the album has been subsequently reissued multiple times on both LP and CD.

== Music ==
"Southern Nights", which would become Toussaint's signature song, was written as a tribute to evenings spent with his Creole family in his native Louisiana. It was brought to the attention of Glen Campbell by Campbell-collaborator Jimmy Webb. Campbell released a cover version on the album Southern Nights in February 1977, which spent four weeks at the top of the country, pop and adult contemporary charts. Toussaint's version of the song was very different from the "cheerful catchiness and...bright, colorful feel" of Campbell's; Stephen Thomas Erlewine described it as featuring a "swirling, trippy arrangement that plays like a heat mirage", while The Times-Picayune remarked in 2009 on its "strange psychedelic-swamp-water sound." In 1994, Toussaint came out of a lengthy hiatus as a performer to record the song in a duet with Chet Atkins for the compilation album Rhythm, Country and Blues.

Bonnie Raitt also had success with her cover of "What Do You Want the Girl to Do", retitled "What Do You Want the Boy to Do?" and released on 1975's Home Plate.

== Reception ==
Professional ratings
Review scores
Source	Rating
AllMusic	4.5/5 stars
Christgau's Record Guide	B−
The Village Voice	C+

According to 2002's Louisiana Music, the album is regarded as "perhaps...[Toussaint's] signature record"; in 1994, Toussaint himself characterized the album as his best. Although overall a critical success, it was not financially successful and was not universally well received. Stephen Thomas Erlewine of AllMusic indicates that the album should be "part of any serious soul collection", but notes that the presence of instrumental filler material "prevents [it] from being a full-fledged masterpiece".

== Track listing ==
All tracks composed by Allen Toussaint.

1. "Last Train" – 3:01
2. "Worldwide" – 2:42
3. "Back in Baby's Arms" – 4:49
4. "Country John" – 4:45
5. "Basic Lady" – 2:58
6. "Southern Nights" – 3:36
7. "You Will Not Lose" – 3:42
8. "What Do You Want the Girl to Do?" – 3:40
9. "When the Party's Over" – 2:38
10. "Cruel Way to Go Down" – 3:52

== Personnel ==
Performers

- Allen Toussaint – lead and backing vocals, keyboards, guitar, harmonica
- Arthur Neville – organ
- Leo Nocentelli – guitar
- Charles Moore – guitar
- Teddy Royal – guitar
- George Porter Jr. – bass guitar
- Richy Powell – bass guitar
- Joseph Modeliste – drums
- Clyde Williams – drums
- Alfred Roberts – congas
- Gary Brown – tenor saxophone
- Lon Price – tenor saxophone, alto saxophone, flute
- Jim Moore – tenor saxophone, flute
- Carl Blouin – baritone saxophone
- Claude Kerr Jr. – trumpet, flugelhorn
- Steve Howard – trumpet
- Lester Caliste – trombone
- Joan Harmon – backing vocals
- Deborah Paul – backing vocals
- Sharon Nabonne – backing vocals

Production

- Greg Burgess – liner notes
- Roberta Grace – engineer
- Gary Hobish – reissue mastering
- Ken Laxton – engineer
- Bob Merlis – photography
- Patrick Roques – reissue art direction, reissue design
- Filippo Salvadori – reissue producer
- Marshall Sehorn – producer
- George Stavrinos – cover illustration
- Ed Thrasher – art direction
- Allen Toussaint – arranger, producer

== Release history ==
Region	Date	Label	Format	Catalog
United States	May 1975	Reprise Records	Stereo LP	MS 2186
United Kingdom	March 1985	Edsel Records	Stereo LP	ED 155
United States	April 1996	Reprise Records	CD	7599 26596-2
United States	2000	Warner.Esp	CD	7599265962
United States	2006	Water Records	CD	WATR 177
United States	2008	Reprise Records	CD	75407
