= Nocentelli: Live in San Francisco =

Live album by Leo Nocentelli
- Released: November 4, 1997
- Venues: Slim's, San Francisco
- Genre: Funk
- Length: 1:02:26
- Label: DJM (DJM-CD 10014)
- Producer: Leo Nocentelli

Nocentelli: Live in San Francisco is a live album by guitarist Leo Nocentelli of The Meters. The album was recorded at Slim's nightclub in San Francisco. It was released by DJM Records in November 1997.

== Background ==
Nocentelli performed regularly in a quartet with drummer Ziggy Modeliste. On this recording the quartet included keyboardist Kevin Walsh and bassist Nick Daniels. The performance was recorded by an audience member at Slim's nightclub in San Francisco. Unaware of the recording, Nocentelli received a Digital Audio Tape from the audience member. He asked a friend to convert it to analog tape. During conversion, a DJM Records executive heard the music and arranged for its release as an album.

== Reception ==
Professional ratings
Review scores
Source	Rating
AllMusic	3/5 stars
JazzTimes	Positive
Blues Access	Positive

Don Snowden of AllMusic noted that the album "could have been a great glimpse of two masters revisiting past highlights" and found it not fully satisfying. Tony Green of JazzTimes wrote, "the extended jams (...) give Nocentelli the space to step out of his rhythm guitar role for some smoldering classic fusion-leaning solos." John Koetzner of Blues Access had a positive review and said the album is a great way to discover The Meters and Nocentelli's talent.

== Track listing ==
All tracks are written by The Meters (Leo Nocentelli, Ziggy Modeliste, George Porter Jr., Art Neville); except where noted.

No.	Title	Writer(s)	Length
1.	"Fire on the Bayou/1984"		10:12
2.	"People Say"		10:34
3.	"Que Sera, Sera""	Jay Livingston, Ray Evans	10:18
4.	"The Hype and the Hoopla"	Leo Nocentelli	4:55
5.	"Africa"		7:01
6.	"Doops Interlude"	Leo Nocentelli	1:27
7.	"Come Back Jack"	Leo Nocentelli	6:26
8.	"Hey Pocky Way"		6:51
9.	"Cissy Strut"		4:42

== Personnel ==
Credits adapted from AllMusic.

- Leo Nocentelli – guitar, vocals, liner notes, producer
- Zigaboo Modeliste – drums, vocals
- Nick Daniels – bass, vocals
- Kevin Walsh – keyboards
- Dan Morehouse – digital mastering, editing
