= Stevie Wonder's Superego =

SuperEgo
- Origin: Detroit, United States
- Genres: Funk, Lounge music, Experimental music
- Years active: 1979
- Past members: Stevie Wonder

SuperEgo was an instrumental project conceived and produced by Stevie Wonder in 1979.

== Concept ==
Stevie, who had been growing his interest in electronic music, tried to create an album with constant BPMs and heavily use of overdubbing techniques. Often counting with The Meters as his backing band, Stevie recorded two albums (Vol. 1 and Vol. 2) at his home studio in Detroit through a nine-month period. Both albums were finished but never released and then abandoned due to "lack of commercial power", as he says.

== Members ==
- Stevie Wonder - piano, clavinet, drum machine, synthesizers
- Art Neville - hammond organ, synthesizers
- Ziggy Modeliste - drums
- Leo Nocentelli - guitar
- George Porter Jr. - bass guitar
