= Funkify Your Life: The Meters Anthology =

Compilation album by The Meters
- Released: 1995
- Recorded: 1968–1977
- Genre: Funk
- Length: 2:23:02
- Label: Rhino / WEA (B0000033GN)

The Meters chronology
Fundamentally Funky (1994)	Funkify Your Life: The Meters Anthology (1995)	Kickback (2001)

Funkify Your Life: The Meters Anthology is a compilation album by the funk group The Meters. The album was released in 1995 by Rhino Records. It is a comprehensive compilation of the band's work.

== Background ==
Disc one is a compilation of work released under Josie Records from 1969 to 1972. It includes 19 songs from the band's first three albums, arranged chronologically, followed by 7 songs released as singles. It starts off with instrumental tracks and vocal tracks appear later. In 1972 the band signed with Reprise Records, a subsidiary of Warner Bros. Records. Disk two, also arranged chronologically, is a compilation of 17 songs from the band's five albums under Reprise from 1972 to 1977. Most tracks feature vocals and tracks 8 through 17 include Cyril Neville as a band member.

The Meters disbanded in 1979. There have been several reincarnations and reunions including a 2015 performance at the New Orleans Jazz Festival, however, there were no studio album releases under the original band name after 1977. According to AllMusic, Funkify Your Life was "the first truly comprehensive and widely available" compilation of the band's work.

== Reception ==
Professional ratings
Review scores
Source	Rating
AllMusic	5/5 stars
Robert Christgau	A−

Steve Huey of AllMusic wrote, what sets the music apart is the delivery of melody through single-note guitar lines and drummer Modeliste's "dominating" performance. He gave the album a five star rating and added "for devoted funk fans, Funkify Your Life should be considered essential listening." In his reviews, Robert Christgau also noted Modeliste's "eccentric" articulation. He called the band "totally original" and said the music is "sometimes too minimal, and not devoid of dead spots. But seminal and essential – and fun." He placed the album on his top six New Orleans classics list.

== Track listing ==
All tracks are written by The Meters (George Porter Jr., Ziggy Modeliste, Art Neville, Leo Nocentelli), except as noted.

Disc 1
No.	Title	Writer(s)	Length
1.	"Cissy Strut"		3:07
2.	"Here Comes the Meter Man"		2:56
3.	"Live Wire"		2:40
4.	"Sophisticated Cissy"		2:57
5.	"Ease Back"		3:15
6.	"Stormy"	Buddy Buie, J. R. Cobb	3:39
7.	"Look-Ka Py Py"		3:19
8.	"Pungee"		3:00
9.	"Thinking"		1:42
10.	"This Is My Last Affair"		2:55
11.	"Funky Miracle"		2:28
12.	"Yeah, You're Right"		2:46
13.	"Little Old Money Maker"		2:41
14.	"Dry Spell"		2:30
15.	"Chicken Strut"		2:45
16.	"Same Old Thing"		2:50
17.	"Darling Darling Darling"	The Meters, Roquel Davis, Maurice McAlister	2:54
18.	"Tippi-Toes"		2:27
19.	"Ride Your Pony"	Naomi Neville (Allen Toussaint)	3:18
20.	"A Message from the Meters"	Leo Nocentelli	2:43
21.	"Zony Mash"		3:01
22.	"Stretch Your Rubber Band"	Leo Nocentelli	2:44
23.	"Groovy Lady"	Ziggy Modeliste, Leo Nocentelli	2:46
24.	"(The World Is a Bit Under the Weather) Doodle-Oop"	Leo Nocentelli, Vincent Toussaint	2:37
25.	"I Need More Time"	Leo Nocentelli	3:16
26.	"Good Old Funky Music"		2:20

Disc 2
No.	Title	Writer(s)	Length
1.	"Stay Away"	Leo Nocentelli	5:22
2.	"Soul Island"		3:10
3.	"Do the Dirt"	Leo Nocentelli	2:36
4.	"Cabbage Alley"	Art Neville	3:30
5.	"People Say"		5:16
6.	"Hey Pocky A-Way"		4:04
7.	"Africa"		3:58
8.	"Fire on the Bayou"	The Meters, Cyril Neville	4:07
9.	"Talkin' 'Bout New Orleans"	The Meters, Cyril Neville	3:35
10.	"They All Ask'd for You"		4:10
11.	"Running Fast (Single Version)"		3:22
12.	"(Doodle Loop) the World Is a Little Bit Under the Weather"	Leo Nocentelli, Vincent Toussaint	3:52
13.	"Trick Bag"	Earl King	3:20
14.	"Hang 'Em High"	Dominic Frontiere	2:20
15.	"Be My Lady"	The Meters, Cyril Neville	6:27
16.	"Funkify Your Life"	The Meters, Cyril Neville	5:42
17.	"Give It What You Can"	Steve Cropper, Carl Marsh, Jimmy Tarbutton	4:35

== Personnel ==
Credits adapted from AllMusic, with added primary artist vocal credits, and added 'select tracks' notation.

Primary artist
- Art Neville – keyboards, vocals, composer, producer
- Leo Nocentelli – guitar, composer, producer, background vocals
- Ziggy Modeliste – drums, vocals, composer, producer
- George Porter Jr. – bass, composer, producer, background vocals
Disc 2
- Cyril Neville – congas, percussion, vocals, producer, composer (Disc 2, tracks 8, 9, 15, 16)

Production

- Allen Toussaint – producer, composer (Disc 1, track 19)
- Marshall Sehorn – producer
- David Rubinson – producer (Disc 2, tracks 15, 16, 17)

Additional performance

- Tony Owens – background vocals (select tracks)
- Terry Smith – background vocals (select tracks)
- Squirrel – congas (select tracks)

Additional composition

- Buddy Buie – composer (Disc 1, track 6)
- James Cobb – composer (Disc 1, track 6)
- Steve Cropper – composer (Disc 2, track 17)
- Roquel Davis – composer (Disc 1, track 17)
- Dominic Frontiere – composer (Disc 2, track 14)
- Earl King – composer, guest artist, unknown contributor role, vocals (Disc 2, track 13)
- Carl Marsh – composer (Disc 2, track 17)
- Maurice McAlister – composer (Disc 1, track 17)
- Naomi Neville (alias for Allen Toussaint) – composer (Disc 1, track 19)
- Jimmy Tarbutton – composer (Disc 2, track 17)
- Vincent Toussaint – composer (Disc 1, track 24, Disc 2, track 12)
- Wardell Quezergue – arranger, horn arrangements (select tracks)

Compilation production

- James Austin – compilation producer
- Don Snowden – compilation producer, liner notes
- A. Scott Galloway – liner notes
- Bob Fisher – tape research
- Bill Inglot – remastering
- Ken Perry – remastering
- Ted Myers – project assistant
- Sevie Bates – design
- Coco Shinomiya – artwork
- Michael P. Smith – photography
- Gary Peterson – discographical annotation
