= Struttin' =

Studio album by the Meters
- Released: June 1970
- Genre: Funk
- Length: 40:27
- Label: Josie (JOS-4012)
- Producer: Allen Toussaint, Marshall Sehorn

The Meters chronology
Look-Ka Py Py (1969)	Struttin' (1970)	Cabbage Alley (1972)

Struttin' is the third studio album by the funk group the Meters. It is the band's first album featuring vocal performances.

== Background ==
The album was recorded in Cosimo Matassa's studio and released in 1970 by Josie Records. It is the band's first album featuring full vocal performances by Art Neville on three tracks, "Wichita Lineman", "Darling, Darling, Darling" and "Ride Your Pony".

== Reception ==
Professional ratings
Review scores
Source	Rating
Allmusic	3.5/5 stars
Christgau's Record Guide	B+

Stephen Erlewine noted a continuation of the band's sound in comparison to previous albums and called it "organic, earthy funk". He noted a stylistic divergence in tracks "Joog", "Hand Clapping Song" and the vocal tracks. He called the music enjoyable but noted a lack of coherence in the song collection. Robert Christgau had a favorable view and wrote of the band's style: "The New Orleans M.G.'s swing, but not smoothly, the way a big band does--their Caribbean lilt is pure second-line, as elliptical as a saint's march."

The first single was the song "Chicken Strut". It reached #11 on the U.S. R&B Singles chart and the album reached #32 on the U.S. R&B Albums chart.

== Track listing ==
All tracks are written by Ziggy Modeliste, Leo Nocentelli, George Porter Jr. and Art Neville, except as noted.

No.	Title	Writer(s)	Length
1.	"Chicken Strut"		3:14
2.	"Liver Splash"		2:42
3.	"Wichita Lineman"	Jimmy Webb	2:59
4.	"Joog"		2:13
5.	"Go for Yourself"		3:12
6.	"Same Old Thing"		2:50
7.	"Hand Clapping Song"		2:56
8.	"Darling Darling Darling"	Roquel Davis	2:54
9.	"Tippi-Toes"		2:29
10.	"Britches"		2:52
11.	"Hey! Last Minute"		3:00
12.	"Ride Your Pony"	Naomi Neville	3:22

2001 digitally remastered CD bonus tracks
No.	Title	Length
13.	"Funky Meters Soul"	2:57
14.	"Meters Strut"	2:47

== Personnel ==
The Meters

- Art Neville – organ, keyboards, vocals
- Leo Nocentelli – guitar
- George Porter Jr. – bass guitar
- Ziggy Modeliste – drums, percussion

Production

- Allen Toussaint – producer
- Marshall Sehorn – producer
- Tim Livingston – project manager
- David Smith – recording and mixing engineer
- Bob Irwin – mastering
- Rich Russell – package design
