= The Meters (album) =

Studio album by the Meters
- Released: May 1969
- Recorded: 1969
- Genre: Funk
- Length: 43:05
- Label: Josie (JOS-4010)
- Producer: Allen Toussaint, Marshall Sehorn

The Meters chronology
The Meters (1969)	Look-Ka Py Py (1969)

Singles from The Meters
- 1. "Sophisticated Cissy" Released: October 1968; 2. "Cissy Strut" Released: March 1969; 3. "Ease Back" Released: July 1969

Album's back cover depicting band members in 1969. Left to right: Modeliste, Neville, Porter, Nocentelli.

The Meters is the debut album by the American funk group the Meters. It was released in May 1969, the first of eight albums by the band. The band's early works were developed through improvisation. Band members had spent most of the 1960s performing together in nightclubs of New Orleans. They had a fluid musical style that included elements of R&B, rock, and jazz.

== Background ==
The first track, "Cissy Strut", was the band's opening song during their residency at the Ivanhoe nightclub in late 1960s. The original melody was introduced by Leo Nocentelli. The song was not yet titled, and the band's name was Art Neville and the Neville Sounds. The song was recorded at the Cosimo Studios. It was first released as a single and sold 200,000 copies in two weeks. Its commercial success became an impetus for the band's name change and subsequent recording career.

The variety of instruments on the album's cover symbolizes the diversity of compositions and rhythms. Its back cover depicts the band members in the early phase of their career. Many of the band's early instrumental tracks were named only after they were recorded. The album's eighth track was named for the 6V6 vacuum tube, which is commonly used in guitar amplifiers.

== Reception ==
Professional ratings
Review scores
Source	Rating
Allmusic	3/5 stars
Revive Music	Positive
Vermont Review	Positive

A review by AllMusic noted the music's simplicity and nuance and called it "impressive". Tamara Davidson of Revive Music had a positive review and wrote "the album is filled with infectious grooves, filthy bass lines, and revolutionary drum rhythms." According to Brian Knight of The Vermont Review, the album "set the pace for both the Meters and the entire New Orleans funk sound."

Jeff Chang described the band in relation to the cultural backdrop of the 1960s, their influences, and their influence on music. He wrote: "Modeliste once described the songs as 'soundbites,' as 'entries of different grooves and different ideas about groove.' Indeed, they could fill a jam-band encyclopedia, hundreds of little ideas that could each be stretched out like twenty-minute rubber bands."

== Track listing ==
All tracks are written by Art Neville, Ziggy Modeliste, Leo Nocentelli and George Porter Jr., except where noted.

No.	Title	Writer(s)	Length
1.	"Cissy Strut"		3:06
2.	"Here Comes the Meter Man"		2:55
3.	"Cardova"		4:35
4.	"Live Wire"		2:40
5.	"Art"		2:35
6.	"Sophisticated Cissy"		2:56
7.	"Ease Back"		3:14
8.	"6V6 LA"		2:26
9.	"Sehorn's Farm^{1}"		2:31
10.	"Ann"		2:46
11.	"Stormy"	Buddy Buie, J.R. Cobb	3:40
12.	"Simple Song"	Sly Stone	3:06

2001 CD bonus tracks
No.	Title	Writer(s)	Length
13.	"The Look of Love"	Burt Bacharach, Hal David	3:39
14.	"Soul Machine"		3:28

^{1} Listed as "Sehorns Farm" on original LP release; and "Sehorns Farms" on original 45 rpm single.

== Personnel ==
Credits adapted from AllMusic.

The Meters

- Art Neville – organ, keyboards
- Ziggy Modeliste – drums
- Leo Nocentelli – guitar
- George Porter Jr. – bass guitar

Production

- Allen Toussaint – producer
- Marshall Sehorn – producer
- Giovanni Scatola – remastering
- Janie Gans – art supervisor
- Jake Kennedy – liner notes

== Charts ==
Weekly charts

Chart (1969)	Peak position
US R&B Albums (Billboard)	23
US Billboard 200	108

Singles

Title	Year	Peak chart positions		Album
Title	Year	US	R&B	Album
"Cissy Strut"	1969	23	4	The Meters
"Sophisticated Cissy"	1969	34	7	The Meters
"Ease Back"	1969	61	20	The Meters
