= Look-Ka Py Py =

Studio album by the Meters
- Released: December 1969
- Studios: LeFevre Sound Studios, Atlanta, Georgia
- Genre: Funk
- Length: 32:33
- Label: Josie
- Producers: Allen Toussaint, Marshall Sehorn

The Meters chronology
The Meters (1969)	Look-Ka Py Py (1969)	Struttin' (1970)

Look-Ka Py Py is the second studio album by the American funk group the Meters. The instrumental album was ranked number 218 on the Rolling Stone list of 500 Greatest Albums of All Time in 2003, 220 on the 2012 revised list and 415 on the 2020 revised list.

== Reception ==
Professional ratings
Review scores
Source	Rating
AllMusic	4/5 stars
Pitchfork	10/10
Rolling Stone	4/5 stars

Cub Koda of AllMusic said of the album and the band: "The second album by The Meters continues the sound that made them New Orleans legends." Ted Drozdowski of Rolling Stone characterized the album's sound as "clear, unhurried and certain". He characterized the guitar sound as "brief, precise", the organ sound as "free of the rhythm", the bass sound as "fat, saw-tooth grooves", and the drum sound as "dry and up front". In ranking the album for its greatest-all-time list, the magazine noted the bass riffs and the off-beat drumming.

The album's title track reached number 11 on the US R&B Singles chart and the album reached number 23 on the US R&B Albums chart.

== Style ==
In his 2008 book, Tom Moon wrote: "the key characteristic is restraint. Nobody works too hard on Meters records. The rhythm is built on a loose-tight axis, with some elements (usually Zigaboo Modeliste's snappish drumming) pushing forward and other forces (the carefully articulated guitar lines of Leo Nocentelli or spare jabs from Art Neville's B3 organ) pulling back."

== Track listing ==
All tracks are written by Art Neville, Ziggy Modeliste, Leo Nocentelli and George Porter, Jr., except as noted.

No.	Title	Writer(s)	Length
1.	"Look-Ka Py Py"		3:20
2.	"Rigor Mortis"		2:38
3.	"Pungee"		3:01
4.	"Thinking"		1:45
5.	"This Is My Last Affair"		2:55
6.	"Funky Miracle"		2:28
7.	"Yeah, You're Right"		2:46
8.	"Little Old Money Maker"		2:42
9.	"Oh, Calcutta!"	Stanley Walden	2:45
10.	"The Mob"		2:49
11.	"9 'Til 5"		2:51
12.	"Dry Spell"		2:33

2001 digitally remastered CD bonus tracks
No.	Title	Length
13.	"Grass"	2:42
14.	"Borro"	2:12

== Personnel ==
The Meters

- Ziggy Modeliste – drums
- Art Neville – organ
- Leo Nocentelli – electric guitar
- George Porter Jr. – bass guitar

Production

- Allen Toussaint – producer
- Marshall Sehorn – audio production
- Tim Livingston – project manager
- Rodney Mills – audio engineer
- Al Quaglieri – mastering
- Bob Irwin – mastering
- Rich Russell – package design
- Bill Dahl – liner notes
