= Life, Love and Faith =

Studio album by Allen Toussaint
- Released: June 15, 1972
- Recorded: 1971–1972
- Genre: Funk, jazz
- Length: 38:04
- Label: Warner Bros.
- Producer: Allen Toussaint

Allen Toussaint chronology
Toussaint (1971)	Life, Love and Faith (1972)	Southern Nights (1975)

Life, Love and Faith is the fourth album by R&B artist Allen Toussaint. It was released in 1972 and has received positive reviews. Warner Reprise ranks Life, Love and Faith as a very influential singer/songwriter album. The album also shows signs of early funk. Twenty-two musicians helped Toussaint record the album including one of his family members, Vincent Toussaint, and George Porter Jr. and Leo Nocentelli from the Meters, a group associated with Toussaint. The album is considered one of Toussaint's best.

Professional ratings
Review scores
Source	Rating
Christgau's Record Guide	B+

== Track listing ==
All tracks composed by Allen Toussaint

1. "Victims of the Darkness
2. "Am I Expecting Too Much"
3. "My Baby Is the Real Thing"
4. "Goin' Down"
5. "She Once Belonged to Me"
6. "Out of the City (Into Country Life)"
7. "Soul Sister"
8. "Fingers and Toes"
9. "I've Got to Convince Myself"
10. "On Your Way Down"
11. "Gone Too Far"
12. "Electricity"

== Personnel ==
- Allen Toussaint - vocals, piano, acoustic guitar, harmonica, arrangements
- George Plummer, Leo Nocentelli, Vincent Toussaint - guitar
- George Porter Jr. - bass
- Walter Payton - acoustic bass
- Joe Lambert, Joseph Modeliste - drums
- Alfred Roberts, Squirrel - congas
- Alvin Thomas, Gary Brown - saxophone
- Francis Rousselle - trumpet
- Clyde Kerr, Jr. - trumpet, trombone
- Lee Hildebrand - liner notes
