= In the Right Place =

Studio album by Dr. John
- Released: February 25, 1973
- Recorded: 1972
- Studios: Criteria (Miami, Florida)
- Genre: Rock
- Length: 33:22
- Label: Atco
- Producer: Allen Toussaint

Dr. John chronology
Dr. John's Gumbo (1972)	In the Right Place (1973)	Desitively Bonnaroo (1974)

Singles from In the Right Place
- 1. "Right Place Wrong Time" Released: March 1973; 2. "Such A Night" Released: September 1973

Professional ratings
Review scores
Source	Rating
AllMusic	4.5/5 stars
Christgau's Record Guide	B+

In the Right Place is the sixth album by the New Orleans R&B artist Dr. John. The album was released on Atco Records in 1973, and became the biggest selling album of Dr. John's career.

The song "Such a Night" was also performed as part of the Band's The Last Waltz concert, made famous by Martin Scorsese's film. The same song was reinterpreted with satirical anglicized neapolitan lyrics by Renzo Arbore in 1981, under the title Smorza 'e llights.

The song "Right Place, Wrong Time" became the biggest hit from the LP, reaching the Top 10 in both the U.S. and Canada. The album itself was Dr. John's highest charting album on the Billboard 200, spending 33 weeks on the chart and peaking at No. 24 on June 23, 1973.

== Track listing ==
All tracks are written by Mac Rebennack; except where indicated.

No.	Title	Writer(s)	Length
1.	"Right Place, Wrong Time"		2:50
2.	"Same Old Same Old"		2:39
3.	"Just the Same"		2:49
4.	"Qualified"	Jessie Hill, Mac Rebennack	4:46
5.	"Traveling Mood"	James Waynes	3:03
6.	"Peace Brother Peace"		2:47
7.	"Life"	Allen Toussaint	2:29
8.	"Such a Night"		2:55
9.	"Shoo Fly Marches On"		3:15
10.	"I Been Hoodood"		3:12
11.	"Cold Cold Cold"	Alvin Robinson, Jessie Hill, Mac Rebennack	2:37

== Personnel ==
Musicians

- Mac Rebennack – vocals, piano on "Qualified", organ on "Peace Brother Peace" and percussion on "I Been Hoodood"
- Allen Toussaint – piano, electronic piano, acoustic guitar, conga drums, tambourine, background vocals, vocal arrangements, song arrangements and conducting
- Gary Brown – electric and acoustic saxophones

The Meters

- Art Neville – organ
- Leo Nocentelli – lead guitar
- George Porter Jr. – bass
- Joseph Modeliste – drums

Additional musicians

- Ralph MacDonald – percussion on "Such a Night", "Shoo Fly Marches On" and "I Been Hoodood".
- David Spinozza – electric guitar solo on "Right Place Wrong Time".
- The Bonaroo Horn Section – horns
- Robbie Montgomery and Jessie Smith – backing vocals

Technical

- Allen Toussaint – producer
- Karl Richardson – engineer
- Allen Toussaint, Arif Mardin and Jimmy Douglass – remix engineers
- James Flournoy Holmes – album design and paintings

== Charts ==
Chart (1973)	Peak position
Canada Top Albums/CDs (RPM)	26
US Billboard 200	24
