= Fire on the Bayou =

Studio album by the Meters
- Released: July 1975
- Studio: Sea-Saint
- Genre: Funk
- Length: 45:55 (11 track release)
- Label: Reprise (MS 2228)
- Producer: Allen Toussaint, the Meters

The Meters chronology
Rejuvenation (1974)	Fire on the Bayou (1975)	Trick Bag (1976)

Fire on the Bayou is the sixth studio album by the funk band the Meters.

== Background and release ==
This was the band's first album with Cyril Neville as a member. At the time, the band's headlining performances were receiving good reviews. According to a review in The Real Paper, "they could blow virtually any other band in the country right off the stage." The album was released in July 1975, at a time when the band was opening for the Rolling Stones on their U.S. Tour. The album sold 88,000 copies and didn't meet the record label's expectations. According to Rupert Surcouf, the band's road manager at the time, the record label realized "the Meters didn't fit into any conventional mold", and the label had difficulty promoting the music.

== Reception ==
Professional ratings
Review scores
Source	Rating
AllMusic	4.5/5 stars
Christgau's Record Guide	B

Stephen Erlewine of AllMusic had a positive view and wrote "there never seems to be a concession to mainstream funk" and called the music "simmering". Ed Ward of Rolling Stone had a negative view and called the music "aimless" in comparison to the band's early works. Robert Christgau had a mixed view and gave the album a B-rating.

== Track listing ==
All tracks are written by the Meters (Art Neville, Ziggy Modeliste, Leo Nocentelli, George Porter, Jr.) except as noted

No.	Title	Writer(s)	Length
1.	"Out in the Country"		3:38
2.	"Fire on the Bayou"	The Meters, Cyril Neville	4:10
3.	"Love Slip Upon Ya"		4:59
4.	"Talkin' 'Bout New Orleans"	The Meters, Cyril Neville	3:38
5.	"They All Ask'd for You"		4:12
6.	"Can You Do Without?"		3:52
7.	"Liar"	Russ Ballard	5:12
8.	"You're a Friend of Mine"		4:11
9.	"Middle of the Road"		7:57
10.	"Running Fast"		1:27
11.	"Mardi Gras Mambo"	Frankie Adams, Lou Welsch, Ken Elliot	2:39

Bonus tracks on the 2001 digitally remastered CD
No.	Title	Writer(s)	Length
12.	"Running Fast" (Single Version)		3:26
13.	"Keep On Marching"		3:20
14.	"He Bite Me"		2:54
15.	"A Mother's Love"		2:19
16.	"Jambalaya"	Hank Williams & Moon Mullican	2:45

- "Jambalaya" has wrongly been credited to the members of the Meters in this reissue.

== Personnel ==
Credits adapted in part from AllMusic.

The Meters

- George Porter Jr. – bass guitar, producer, backing vocals
- Joseph Modeliste – drums, producer, vocals, graphic design, photo courtesy
- Leo Nocentelli – guitar, producer, backing vocals
- Art Neville – keyboards, producer, vocals
- Cyril Neville – congas, percussion, producer, vocals

Additional composition

- Wardell Quezergue – horn arrangements

Production

- Allen Toussaint – producer
- Marshall Sehorn – executive producer, remixing
- Efram Turchick – project manager
- Tim Livingston – project manager
- Roberta Grace – engineer
- Ken Laxton – engineer, remixing
- Bob Irwin – mastering
- Al Quaglieri – mastering
- Bunny Matthews – liner notes
- Rich Russell – design
- Paul Howrilla (aka Paul Andrew) – graphic design, photo courtesy of Photographique Studios, Inc.
