= Desitively Bonnaroo =

Studio album by Dr. John
- Released: April 8, 1974
- Recorded: 1974
- Studios: Criteria (Miami, Florida); Sea Saint (New Orleans, Louisiana)
- Genres: Rock and roll; funk
- Length: 37:12
- Label: Atco
- Producer: Allen Toussaint

Dr. John chronology
In the Right Place (1973)	Desitively Bonnaroo (1974)	Hollywood Be Thy Name (1975)

Singles from Desitively Bonnaroo
- 1. "(Everybody Wanna Get Rich) Rite Away" Released: April 1974; 2. "Let's Make A Better World" Released: July 1974

Professional ratings
Review scores
Source	Rating
AllMusic	3.5/5 stars
Christgau's Record Guide	B+

Desitively Bonnaroo is a 1974 album by the New Orleans rhythm and blues musician Dr. John. The album was produced by Allen Toussaint and features sizable musical support from the Meters. The album mines the territory featured on his previous album, In The Right Place. It spent eight weeks on the Billboard 200, peaking at No. 105 on June 1, 1974.

The Bonnaroo Music Festival was named after the album title, when the festival's founders looked through old albums for inspiration. Bonnaroo is derived from French bonne /bɔn/, the feminine form of bon /bɔ̃/ meaning "good," and French rue /ry/ meaning "street," translating roughly to "the best on the streets."

== Track listing ==
All tracks are written by Mac Rebennack, except where indicated.

No.	Title	Writer(s)	Length
1.	"Quitters Never Win"		3:17
2.	"Stealin'"		3:32
3.	"What Comes Around (Goes Around)"		3:13
4.	"Me – You = Loneliness"		3:06
5.	"Mos' Scocious"		2:47
6.	"(Everybody Wanna Get Rich) Rite Away"		2:43
7.	"Let's Make a Better World"	Earl King	2:58
8.	"R U 4 Real"		4:16
9.	"Sing Along Song"		2:44
10.	"Can't Git Enuff"		3:00
11.	"Go Tell the People"	Allen Toussaint	3:06
12.	"Desitively Bonnaroo"	Jessie Hill, Rebennack	2:31

== Personnel ==
Musicians

- Dr John – guitar, piano, sound effects, vocals
- Allen Toussaint – keyboards, percussion, arrangements, background vocals

The Meters

- Art Neville – organ, keyboards
- Leo Nocentelli – lead guitar
- George Porter Jr. – bass
- Joseph "Ziggy" Modeliste – drums

Additional musicians

- Gary Brown – alto, soprano & tenor saxophone
- Mark Colby – clarinet, tenor saxophone
- Whit Sidener – baritone & alto saxophone
- Peter Graves – trombone
- Kenneth Faulk – trumpet, flugelhorn
- Robbie Montgomery, Jessie Smith – background vocals

Technical

- Allen Toussaint – producer
- Karl Richardson – engineer
- Ken Laxton, Roberta Grace – remix engineers
- George Piros – mastering engineer
- Larry Summers – design
- Bob Nall – illustration
