= Trick Bag =

Studio album by the Meters
- Released: July 22, 1976
- Genre: Funk
- Length: 42:11
- Label: Reprise (MS 2252)
- Producer: Allen Toussaint, the Meters

The Meters chronology
Fire on the Bayou (1975)	Trick Bag (1976)	New Directions (1977)

Trick Bag is the seventh studio album by the funk group the Meters. The name comes from their cover of the Earl King single of the same name.

== Background ==
In spring of 1976 the band was on tour opening for the Rolling Stones on their Tour of Europe '76. According to Jason Berry's Up from the Cradle of Jazz, several tracks on this album are preliminary recordings and were selected for release in the absence of band members.

== Reception ==
Professional ratings
Review scores
Source	Rating
AllMusic	1.5/5 stars
Christgau's Record Guide	C+

Stephen Erlewine had a negative view and critiqued the album's attempt to sound mainstream. He singles out three tracks as exceptions: "Mister Moon", "Doodle Loop" and "Honky Tonk Women". Joe McEwen of Rolling Stone critiqued the song choices and the attempt to please the commercial market. He said two tracks are in-line with the band's style: "Doodle Loop" and "Chug-a-Lug", and had a positive view of the title track "Trick Bag". Robert Christgau also critiqued the song choices and had a positive view of the title track.

== Sampling ==
The instrumental intro to the second track, “Find Yourself”, has been sampled in a number of Hip-Hop songs, including "Feel Me Flow” by Naughty by Nature (1995) and “Honeydips in Gotham” by Boogiemonsters (1994).

== Track listing ==
All tracks are written by The Meters, except as noted.

No.	Title	Writer(s)	Length
1.	"Disco Is the Thing Today"		4:21
2.	"Find Yourself"		4:12
3.	"All These Things"	Naomi Neville	3:32
4.	"I Want to Be Loved by You"		5:24
5.	"Suite for 20 G"	James Taylor	4:32
6.	"Doodle Loop (The World Is a Little Bit Under the Weather)"	Leo Nocentelli, Vincent Toussaint	3:52
7.	"Trick Bag"	Earl King	3:21
8.	"Mister Moon"		4:02
9.	"Chug-a-Lug (Push 'n' Shove)"		3:22
10.	"Hang 'Em High"	Dominic Frontiere	2:17
11.	"Honky Tonk Women"	Mick Jagger, Keith Richards	3:16

2001 digitally remastered CD bonus tracks
No.	Title	Writer(s)	Length
12.	"Love the One You're With"	Stephen Stills	3:31
13.	"What More Can I Do?"		2:47
14.	"Down by the River"	Neil Young	9:02
15.	"Come Together"	John Lennon, Paul McCartney	3:08
16.	"Big Chief"	Earl King	2:57

== Personnel ==
Credits adapted from AllMusic.

- Ziggy Modeliste – drums
- Art Neville – keyboards, vocals
- Cyril Neville – congas, percussion, vocals
- Leo Nocentelli – guitar, backing vocals
- George Porter Jr. – bass guitar
- Kenneth "Afro" Williams – percussion
- Tony Owens – backing vocals
- Terry Smith – backing vocals
- Earl King – father's vocals (track 7)

Production

- The Meters – producer
- Allen Toussaint – producer
- Bob Irwin – mastering
- Bill Dahl – liner notes
- Rich Russell – design
- Ed Thrasher – art direction
- Michael P. Smith – photography
- Tom Copi – photography
