= New Directions (The Meters album) =

Studio album by the Meters
- Released: 1977
- Genre: Funk
- Length: 41:02
- Label: Warner Bros.
- Producers: David Rubinson, Jeffrey Cohen

The Meters chronology
Trick Bag (1976)	New Directions (1977)	Good Old Funky Music (1990)

New Directions is the eighth and final studio album by the funk band the Meters, released in 1977. Produced by David Rubinson in California, it is the band's only album recorded outside New Orleans. The album features the Oakland-based Tower of Power horn section.

== Reception ==
Professional ratings
Review scores
Source	Rating
AllMusic	3/5 stars
Christgau's Record Guide	B+
MusicHound Rock: The Essential Album Guide	2/5 stars
The Virgin Encyclopedia of R&B and Soul	3/5 stars

John Swenson of Rolling Stone said the album "attempts to consolidate the group's style" and noted an overreliance on arrangement rather than the band's musical instinct.

Stephen Erlewine of AllMusic called the music gritty and a move in the right direction as compared to the band's previous album Trick Bag. Robert Christgau called the album "a very good commercial funk record."

== Track listing ==
All tracks are written by Art Neville, Ziggy Modeliste, Cyril Neville, Leo Nocentelli and George Porter Jr., except as noted.

No.	Title	Writer(s)	Length
1.	"No More Okey Doke"		4:20
2.	"I'm Gone"	Allen Toussaint	4:30
3.	"Be My Lady"		6:25
4.	"My Name Up in Lights"		5:23
5.	"Funkify Your Life"		5:40
6.	"Stop That Train"	Peter Tosh	4:50
7.	"We Got the Kind of a Love"	Leo Nocentelli	5:20
8.	"Give It What You Can"	Carl Marsh, James Tarbutton, Steve Cropper	4:34

2001 digitally remastered CD bonus tracks
No.	Title	Writer(s)	Length
9.	"Be My Lady" (Single version)		3:25
10.	"All I Do Every Day" (Previously unreleased demo)	Porter, Modeliste	4:57

== Personnel ==
The Meters

- Ziggy Modeliste – drums, vocals; lead vocals (track 5)
- Art Neville – organ, vocals; lead vocals (tracks 2, 6)
- Cyril Neville – congas, vocals; lead vocals (tracks 1, 3, 4, 7, 8)
- Leo Nocentelli – guitar, vocals
- George Porter Jr. – bass, vocals

Additional personnel

- Emilio Castillo – tenor saxophone
- Mic Gillette – trombone, trumpet, flugelhorn
- Stephen "Doc" Kupka – baritone saxophone
- Lenny Pickett – alto flute, alto and soprano and tenor saxophone
- Kurt McGettrick – baritone saxophone (tracks 1, 2, 4), bass saxophone (track 2), clarinet (track 7), flute (track 7), horn arrangements
- Swamp Tabernacle Choir – background vocals

Production

- David Rubinson – producer, engineer
- Jeffrey Cohen – producer
- Fred Catero – engineer
- Chris Minto – engineer
- Fred Rubinson – engineer
- Bob Irwin – mastering
- Bill Naegels – design
- Rich Russell – design
- Ron Coro – design
- Gary Heery – photography
- Michael P. Smith – photography
- John Cabalka – art direction
- Ed Thrasher – art direction, photography
- Bill Dahl – liner notes
