= I'm On the Right Track =

Studio album by Ziggy Modeliste
- Released: 2004
- Genre: Funk
- Label: JZM Records

Ziggy Modeliste chronology
Zigaboo.com (2000)	I'm On the Right Track (2004)	Funk Me Hard (2009)

I'm On the Right Track is the second album from funk drummer group Ziggy Modeliste of The Meters.

== Track listing ==
1. "Welcome to New Orleans"
2. "I Like It Like That"
3. "Guns"
4. "Love Trying to Get a Hold On Me"
5. "Phat Too's Day"
6. "You Could Be a Movie Star"
7. "Sugar Pants"
8. "Watch It Baby"
9. "Positive"
10. "American Way"
11. "Rollin Stone"
