= Kool & Together =

American funk rock and soul band

Kool & Together is an American funk, soul, and psychedelic rock band from Victoria, Texas. Formed by members of the Sanders family, the group recorded music in the 1970s but remained little known outside South Texas during its original run. Their profile increased after the 2011 release of Original Recordings, 1970–1977, a compilation of archival recordings that led to renewed critical attention and reunion performances.

== History ==
The group originated in Victoria, Texas, where Charles Sanders Jr. and his brothers Joe and Tyrone first performed with their father as My Children + 2. The family later continued without their father under the name Kool & Together. Writers have described the band's sound as mixing soul, funk, and psychedelic rock. During the 1970s, the band recorded songs including the 1973 single "Sittin' on a Red Hot Stove", which later became their best-known recording. Although the group had only modest success during its original period of activity, its recordings later attracted renewed attention from collectors and DJs.

In 2011, Heavy Light Records released Original Recordings, 1970–1977, described by Texas Monthly as the band's first album. The release drew renewed attention from music critics and was included in year-end reissue coverage by Rolling Stone. The reissue led to the band's reunion for its first performance in more than 30 years. That show was scheduled for November 5, 2011, at the Continental Club in Austin. In December 2011, the Victoria Advocate reported that the band would perform at New York's Lincoln Center, describing it as the group's second performance in 30 years. In 2012, The Austin Chronicle reported that Kool & Together was preparing for its fifth performance in more than 30 years and identified guitarist Johnny Ray Barefield as part of the reunited lineup.

== Musical style ==
Kool & Together's music has been described as combining funk, soul, and psychedelic rock. The Austin Chronicle described the band's sound as "lo-fi funk and fuzzy psychedelic rock", while Rolling Stone compared "Sittin' on a Red Hot Stove" to the Meters and Funkadelic.

== Members ==
Documented members of the band have included:

- Charles Sanders Jr.
- Joe Sanders
- Tyrone Sanders
- Johnny Ray Barefield

== Discography ==
- Original Recordings, 1970–1977 (2011)

== Legacy ==
The rediscovery of Kool & Together's recordings in the 2010s brought renewed attention to the band from music writers and collectors.
