= Toussaint (album) =

Studio album by Allen Toussaint
- Released: 1971
- Recorded: Summer 1970
- Genre: Funk, jazz
- Length: 34 min
- Label: Scepter, DJM
- Producer: Allen Toussaint, Charles Greene

Allen Toussaint chronology
The Wild Sound of New Orleans (1958)	Toussaint (1971)	Life, Love and Faith (1972)

Professional ratings
Review scores
Source	Rating
AllMusic	4.5/5 stars
Christgau's Record Guide	B

Toussaint (also known as From a Whisper to a Scream in some editions) is a 1971 funk, jazz and soul album by Allen Toussaint, his second solo album.

== Track listing ==
All songs written and arranged by Allen Toussaint unless otherwise indicated.

1. "From a Whisper to a Scream" – 3:27
2. "Chokin' Kind" (Harlan Howard) – 3:23
3. "Number Nine" – 3:37
4. "Either" – 2:52
5. "Sweet Touch of Love" – 3:20
6. "Working in a Coal Mine" – 3:13
7. "Everything I Do Gonna Be Funky" – 3:12
8. "Louie" – 3:04
9. "What Is Success" – 3:34
10. "Pickles" – 4:27
11. "Cast Your Fate to the Wind" (Carel Rowe, Vince Guaraldi)

== Personnel ==
- Allen Toussaint – piano and vocal
- Mac Rebennack – organ and guitar
- Terry Kellman – guitar
- Eddie Hohner – bass
- Freddie Staehle – drums
- John Boudreaux – drums
- Ed Greene – drums
- Clyde Kerr - trumpet
- Earl Turbinton - alto saxophone
- Frederic Kemp - tenor saxophone
- Merry Clayton - backing vocals
- Venetta Fields - backing vocals
- Dick Smith - artwork
