= There's Room for Us All =

Studio album by Terrance Simien
- Released: 1993
- Studio: Sound Services
- Label: Black Top
- Producer: Daryl Johnson

Terrance Simien chronology
Zydeco on the Bayou (1990)	There's Room for Us All (1993)	Jam the Jazzfest (1998)

There's Room for Us All is the second album by the American musician Terrance Simien, released in 1993. It was recorded with Simien's band, the Mallet Playboys. Simien supported the album with a North American tour.

== Production ==
Recorded at Sound Services, in New Orleans, the album was produced by Daryl Johnson. The recording sessions were casual, with Simien jamming with his band and not worrying about making a traditional zydeco album. "The Maker" was written by Daniel Lanois. The Meters backed Simien on a cover of Floyd King's "Groove Me".

"Dog Hill" is a cover of the Boozoo Chavis song; "Love Land" is a cover of the Charles Wright & the Watts 103rd Street Rhythm Band song. "I Shall Be Released" is a rendition of the Bob Dylan song. The title track was inspired in part by the alarming rise of David Duke.

== Critical reception ==
Professional ratings
Review scores
Source	Rating
AllMusic	3/5 stars
Los Angeles Times	3/4 stars
MusicHound World: The Essential Album Guide	3.5/4 stars
The Penguin Guide to Blues Recordings	2/4 stars

The Washington Post noted that Simien "doesn't help matters by including rap, gospel-soul, reggae, a Bob Dylan song and two collaborations with the Meters on this album ... Simien is competent at them all and superb at none." Rolling Stone called the album "delectable," writing that Simien "makes aural confetti of straight zydeco."

The Chicago Tribune stated that the album "pushes the boundaries of zydeco a bit with some reggae, soul and funk flavorings." The Los Angeles Times concluded that "the pace on this promising return sometimes drags when the mid-tempo R&B tunes aren't balanced with enough straight, up-tempo zydeco."

AllMusic wrote that "Simien is one of zydeco's Young Turks, but on this spectacular album he's more like Mr. Versatile."

== Track listing ==
No.	Title	Length
1.	"Uncle Bud"
2.	"Tout Quelqu'un"
3.	"Come Back Home"
4.	"Will I Ever Learn?"
5.	"The Maker"
6.	"À Ma Maison"
7.	"Groove Me"
8.	"Love Land"
9.	"There's Room for Us All"
10.	"Since It's Over"
11.	"Dog Hill"
12.	"Zydeco Boogaloo"
13.	"I Shall Be Released"
