= Roger St. Pierre =

British journalist, writer, promoter, and broadcaster (1941–2021)

- Born: 8 November 1941; Weymouth, Dorset, England
- Died: 12 October 2021 (aged 79)
- Other names: Peter Kent
- Occupation(s): Journalist, writer, promoter, broadcaster
- Website: rogerstpierre.co.uk

Roger St. Pierre (8 November 1941 – 12 October 2021) was a British journalist, writer, promoter, and broadcaster, particularly on R&B, rock music, travel, and cycling.

He was born in Weymouth, Dorset, but grew up in Goodmayes, Essex. He started writing for local newspapers and specialist cycling magazines in the late 1950s, and for a time was a successful amateur racing cyclist, before concentrating on music journalism and promotion.

In the 1960s and early 1970s he worked on promotion for UK tours by acts including Bill Haley, James Brown, B. B. King, Marvin Gaye, Jerry Lee Lewis and the Jackson Five. He also wrote articles on R&B and soul music for magazines including the New Musical Express, Sounds, Record Mirror, and Blues & Soul, sometimes using the pseudonym Peter Kent. He also wrote liner notes for many LPs and CDs, covering rock, pop, jazz and classical music; he claimed to have written over 1500 sleeve notes. He was the lead writer on the NME Book of Rock, its successor Rock Handbook, and co-writer of The Encyclopedia of Black Music. He also wrote 33 books including biographies of Jimi Hendrix, Tina Turner, and others.

His promotion company, Funk Funktion, promoted British number one hits by M, Althea & Donna, and others. He also set up several record labels including Now! and Energy. As a broadcaster, he appeared on pirate radio and on Solar Radio, broadcasting R&B music. For BBC Radio, he wrote several documentaries including programmes on Atlantic Records, Count Basie, Chuck Berry, and Robert Johnson; and also wrote the script for the television documentary series Reggae.

He died after a lengthy illness on 12 October 2021, aged 79.
