= Cissy Strut =

1969 single by the Meters

Single by The Meters

from the album The Meters
- B-side: "Here Comes the Meter Man"
- Released: March 1969
- Recorded: 1969
- Genre: Funk; swamp rock
- Length: 2:59
- Label: Josie
- Songwriters: Art Neville; Zigaboo Modeliste; Leo Nocentelli; George Porter Jr.
- Producers: Allen Toussaint; Marshall E. Sehorn

The Meters singles chronology
"Sophisticated Cissy" (1968)	"Cissy Strut" (1969)	"Ease Back" (1969)

"Cissy Strut" is a 1969 funk instrumental by the Meters. Released as a single from their eponymous debut album, it reached No. 4 on the R&B chart and No. 23 on the Billboard Hot 100. The tune was inducted into the Grammy Hall of Fame in 2011, which honors "recordings of lasting qualitative or historical significance that are at least 25 years old". The A.V. Club called the song a "classic" deeply rooted in New Orleans music tradition.

The Meters also released another single, "Sophisticated Cissy", from the same album.

"Cissy Strut" was featured in the films Jackie Brown, Red, King Richard, Another Round and Legend, as well as in the BBC television series The Pursuit of Love and in the HBO television series The Wire.

In 2021, Rolling Stone ranked "Cissy Strut" at number 158 on their "500 Greatest Songs of All Time" list, one of the handful of instrumentals to make the list.

== Covers ==
According to a compilation set by WRTC-FM Digital Archive Project the song has been covered by Los Holy's, Johnny Lewis Quartet, Sunny & the Sunliners, KVHW, Dirty Dozen Brass Band with Robert Randolph, Dennis Chambers with John Scofield, U.S. Army Band with Steve Gadd, Los Masters, The Butch Cassidy Sound System, Joe Bravo, Earl Van Dyke, Willard Posey Reunion, Derek Trucks Band, King Herbert & The Knights, Lotus, Zero, and Steve Kimock Band. Other bands that have covered the song are Dave Matthews Band, Big John Patton, Hypnotic Willie, Slightly Stoopid, Free Creek and Oz Noy.

== Cissy Strut album ==
Professional ratings
Review scores
Source	Rating
AllMusic	4.5/5 stars
Christgau's Record Guide	A−

Cissy Strut is a compilation album of thirteen songs released by Island Records in 1974. All songs were originally released by Josie Records on the Meters' first three albums from 1969 to 1970. Robert Christgau had a positive review and called Ziggy Modeliste's drumming "the secret", adding "it's almost as if he's the lead".

Track listing
No.	Title	Length
1.	"Look-Ka Py Py"	3:20
2.	"Tippi-Toes"	2:29
3.	"Darlin' Darlin'"	2:54
4.	"9 'Til 5"	2:51
5.	"Thinking"	1:45
6.	"Funky Miracle"	2:28
7.	"Cissy Strut"	3:04
8.	"Chicken Strut"	3:14
9.	"Live Wire"	2:38
10.	"Here Comes the Meter Man"	2:54
11.	"Ease Back"	3:13
12.	"Ride Your Pony"	3:22
13.	"Sophisticated Cissy"	2:55
