= The Hawketts =

Musical group

- Origin: New Orleans, Louisiana, United States
- Genres: R&B; calypso
- Years active: 1950s
- Labels: Chess
- Past members: Art Neville; George Davis; Alfred August; Israel Bell; August Fleuri; Carroll Joseph; Morris "Moe" Bachemin; John Boudreaux

The Hawketts were an American R&B combo from New Orleans, Louisiana who are best known for their 1954 recording of "Mardi Gras Mambo", a song that has become an iconic classic of the New Orleans Carnival celebration.

The band's members hailed from the African American community in New Orleans, Louisiana, and were all teenagers when they recorded the 1954 song written by Frankie Adams, Ken Elliot and Lou Welsh. Their membership consisted of Art Neville on lead vocals and piano, who was only sixteen years old at the time of the recording, and would later gain fame in the Meters and the Neville Brothers, George Davis on alto sax, Alfred August on guitar, Israel Bell on trumpet, August Fleuri on trumpet, Carroll Joseph on trombone, Morris "Moe" Bachemin on tenor sax, and John Boudreaux on drums. The band had no bass player. According to drummer John Boudreaux, "We didn't know that a band was supposed to have a bass player." The song they recorded reflects rhumba and Caribbean influences in early New Orleans R&B.

== Membership ==
- Art Neville (lead vocals and piano)
- George Davis (alto sax)
- Alfred August (guitar)
- Israel Bell (trumpet)
- August Fleuri (trumpet)
- Carroll Joseph (trombone)
- Morris "Moe" Bachemin (tenor sax)
- John Boudreaux (drums)

== Discography ==
=== 45 rpm ===
- "Mardi Gras Mambo" b/w "Your Time's Up" (Chess, June 1954)
