= Mardi Gras Records =

Mardi Gras Records is a New Orleans music label. Founded by Warren Hildebrand, Mardi Gras Records specializes in compilations and original recordings. Its first album was Mardi Gras in New Orleans, released in 1977.
