= Lakeside Records =

- Country of origin: United States

Lakeside Records has been the name of at least two different record companies.

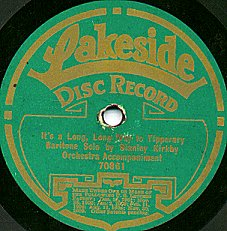
Lakeside Records

The first Lakeside Records was a United States based record label in the years before World War I (1912-1917). Lakeside was manufactured by Columbia Records, who made single-sided lateral-cut disc records to be sold via mail order by Montgomery Ward.

In the 1990s the second Lakeside Records produced compact discs of classical music. This Lakeside Records also made lots of funk music, and was a prominent player in funk CDs at that time

== Popular songs released ==
"Rough Rider", "One Minute After Midnight", "Fantastic Voyage", "From 9:00 Until", "I Need You", "Strung Out", "Your Wish Is My Command", "The Urban Man", "Back Together Again", "We Want You", "Raid", "Turn The Music Up", "Real Love", "Untouchable", "Show You The Way", "Tinse Town Theory", "Money", "Party Patrol", "Still Feeling Good", "Bullseye", "U Got It Goin On", "All For You", "I Want To Hold Your Hand", "If You Like Our Music", "I Can't Get You Out Of My Head", "Shot Of Love", and "Your Love Is On The One".

== See also ==
- List of record labels
