= Mardi Gras Mambo =

Mardi Gras-themed song written by Frankie Adams and Lou Welsch in 1953

Single by Jody Levens
- Released: 1953
- Recorded: 1953
- Genre: Country
- Length: 2:44
- Label: Sapphire
- Songwriters: Frankie Adams, Lou Welsch

"Mardi Gras Mambo"

Single by The Hawketts
- B-side: "Your Time's Up"
- Released: 1954
- Recorded: January 1954
- Genre: R&B, rhumba, calypso
- Length: 2:14
- Label: Chess
- Songwriters: Frankie Adams, Lou Welsch, Ken Elliott
- Producer: Ken Elliott

"Mardi Gras Mambo" is a Mardi Gras-themed song written by Frankie Adams and Lou Welsch. The song's best known version was recorded in 1954 by the Hawketts, whose membership included Art Neville, a founding member of the Meters and the Neville Brothers. It is one of the iconic songs frequently played during the New Orleans Mardi Gras.

== Jody Levens song ==
The original version of the song was written in 1953 by Frankie Adams and Lou Welsch as a country song. It had a syncopated Latino beat. The song was recorded at Cosimo Matassa's studio in New Orleans by singer Jody Levens. Huey Bourgeois was the original guitarist. The song was released as a single in 1953 by Sapphire Records. In 1996, the song was re-released on the compilation album The Best of Sapphire.

== The Hawketts song ==
In the early 1950s, The Hawketts were a seven-piece New Orleans R&B group comprising teenage musicians. Led by Carroll Joseph, in 1953 they recruited 16-year-old Art Neville (later of the Meters and the Neville Brothers). At the time the band's style was calypso-rumba, modeled after Professor Longhair's style. The band was approached by Ken Elliott, aka Jack the Cat, to record the song. Elliott was the disc jockey of WWEZ radio station and knew the local R&B market. Elliott changed some of the original lyrics and kept the song's Latino feel. In January 1954 the song was recorded with two microphones in the studio of WWEZ radio station, with Elliott as the recording engineer and Neville on lead vocals. According to band drummer, John Boudreaux, they tried to play the song in a calypso style. The song has a distinct saxophone opening followed by a grunt by the band members. The song was released on Chess Records in 1954 and became a local hit. It has become a standard of the New Orleans Mardi Gras.

Success of the song boosted the band's popularity. Larry Williams sought them and The Hawketts toured as his backing band. The exposure also helped Neville and he released several singles as a solo artist with Specialty Records. Neville led the band in later years. The song has since been recorded by The Meters, Buckwheat Zydeco and many others. Years later, Boudreaux and Neville spoke about the pride they felt at the time in having a hit song, and the fact that the song has remained popular for so long.

=== Personnel ===
Credits adapted from Mardi Gras in New Orleans liner notes.

- Ken Elliott (aka Jack the Cat) – producer, engineer
- Carroll Joseph – trombone
- Art Neville – vocals, piano
- John Boudreaux – drums
- Israel Bell – trumpet
- August Fleuri – trumpet
- Morris Bechamin – tenor saxophone
- George Davis – alto saxophone
- Alfred August – guitar

== Lyrics ==
Uhh
Down in New Orleans
Where the blues was born
It takes a cool cat to blow a horn
On LaSalle and Rampart Street
The combos play with a mambo beat

The Mardi Gras mambo, mambo, mambo
Mardi Gras mambo, mambo, mambo
Mardi Gras mambo, ooh
Down in New Orleans

In Gert Town where the cats all meet
It's a Mardi Gras mambo with a beat
We shoot and cheer for the Zulu King
And truck on down with a mambo swing

The Mardi Gras mambo, mambo, mambo
Mardi Gras mambo, mambo, mambo
Mardi Gras mambo, ooh
Down in New Orleans

Down in New Orleans
Where the blues was born
It takes a cool cat to blow a horn
On LaSalle and Rampart Street
The combo's there with a mambo beat

The Mardi Gras mambo, mambo, mambo
Mardi Gras mambo, mambo, mambo
Mardi Gras mambo, ooh
Down in New Orleans

Mardi Gras mambo, mambo, mambo
Mardi Gras mambo, mambo, mambo
Mardi Gras mambo, mambo, mambo
Mardi Gras mambo, mambo, mambo
