= Zigaboo Modeliste =

American funk drummer (born 1948)

Ziggy Modeliste
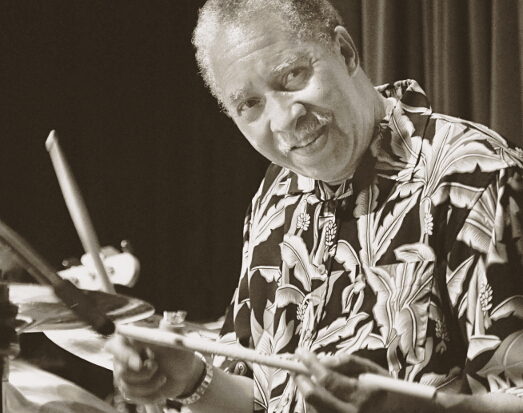
- Modeliste in 2010

Background information
- Also known as: Zigaboo Modeliste
- Born: Joseph Modeliste; December 28, 1948 (age 77); New Orleans, Louisiana, U.S.
- Genres: Funk; second line; jazz; rock
- Occupation: Musician
- Instruments: Drums; percussion; vocals
- Years active: 1965–present
- Label: JZM
- Member of: The Meters
- Website: www.zigaboo.com

Joseph "Ziggy" Modeliste (born December 28, 1948), also known as Zigaboo Modeliste, is an American drummer best known as a founding member of the funk band the Meters. He is widely considered an innovator in the funk genre and New Orleans style drumming. The Meters' music had a defining role and set the stylistic tone of New Orleans funk. Due to his work with the band, Modeliste is credited as an integral part of bringing New Orleans second-line grooves into popular music.

As a songwriter and session musician Modeliste's work is featured in numerous albums by various artists. His drum grooves appear in hundreds of hip hop samples, television and film. He has released four solo albums. He resides in the San Francisco Bay Area and continues to perform and tour.

== Early life ==
Modeliste grew up in the 13th Ward of New Orleans. The eldest of six siblings, he was raised in part by his grandmother, Lula Blouin. His first drum set was a three-piece paid for by Blouin. He was nicknamed Zigaboo at age ten by a neighborhood kid, and by junior high school the name had stuck. His drumming style was influenced by Smokey Johnson, Bob French and other New Orleans drum greats as he learned by watching them perform at gigs. He said listening to other musicians was the most important part of his learning process. He particularly tried to emulate Smokey Johnson's style. He started playing gigs at an early age including a stint with the Hawketts, a band led by Art Neville at the time. Over time the band evolved into the Neville Sounds and by late 1960s into the Meters. In a 2013 interview with Modern Drummer, Modeliste said: "Your biggest teachers were those two things you got on the side of your head. (...) It's got nothing to do with rudiments, nothing to do with time signatures, but it's got a lot to do with what you hear."

== Early career ==
Modeliste was a founding member and drummer of the funk group the Meters. The Meters were formed in 1965 and became well known in the vibrant New Orleans music scene. The band was eventually signed to Allen Toussaint's record label Sansu Enterprises and served as the label's studio band. Over the years the Meters became staple artists and the purveyors of the traditional New Orleans funk sound.

Modeliste's work with The Meters solidified his status as an innovative and skilled drummer. This was further displayed when Modeliste, along with the Meters, were invited to tour with the Rolling Stones in 1975 and 1976 serving as their opening act. The Meters also served as the backing band for acts such as Dr. John, Robert Palmer, Lee Dorsey, Paul McCartney, Betty Harris and others – all with Modeliste on drums. When The Meters disbanded in late 1970s, Modeliste continued to tour and serve as the drummer for various musicians – touring with Keith Richards and Ron Wood in the New Barbarians shortly after the split.

== Later career ==
Modeliste has released three studio albums and a live album as a leader. His first album titled Zigaboo.com was released in 2000. His second album I'm on the Right Track was released in 2004 and features contributors Dr. John and Bernie Worrell. In 2007 he contributed to a tribute album honoring Fats Domino with the song "I'm Gonna Be a Wheel Someday" with collaborators Herbie Hancock and Renard Poche. His live album titled Funk Me Hard Live was released in 2009. The drum heavy performance was recorded in 1980 with Modeliste performing with his first post-Meters band, the Gaboon's Gang, at the Saenger Theatre. His third studio album New Life was released in 2011. The album features works by several artists including Wardell Quezergue and George Porter.

In 2005 he recorded with Young Gunz on the BMI award-winning song "Can't Stop Won't Stop", and his drum patterns were sampled on the percussion heavy Grammy nominated song "1 Thing". In 2011 producer-musician Mark Ronson collaborated with Modeliste, Erykah Badu, Mos Def and Trombone Shorty for the song "A La Modeliste", which was named for Modeliste's influence on funk drumming and the New Orleans sound. He was the featured artist in the August 2013 issue of Modern Drummer magazine.

In the 1980s Modeliste moved to Los Angeles and later to the San Francisco Bay Area, settling in Oakland, California. Having been involved in disputes over publishing rights of the Meters recordings, he got involved in the business side of the music industry. He started a record label, JZM Records, and a music publishing company, Jomod Music. He performs regularly in the San Francisco Bay Area, Los Angeles, and New Orleans.

== Legacy and influence ==
Since the late 1970s, Modeliste has partnered with numerous artists in both a touring and recording capacity. Some of these artists include:

- Dr. John
- The Wild Tchoupitoulas
- Allen Toussaint
- Lee Dorsey
- Robert Palmer
- Keith Richards
- Bill Laswell
- Aaron Neville
- Professor Longhair
- John Fogerty
- Harry Connick Jr.
- Mark Ronson
- Yael Naim
- Kids on Bridges
- Robert Stewart

The Recording Academy awarded Modeliste and the Meters a Lifetime Achievement Grammy Award. Modeliste's work has been influential. His signature drumming style has amassed a large following in the drumming community, in which Modeliste occasionally gives master classes. Some of his best known grooves include "Cissy Strut" and "Look-Ka Py-Py". In reviewing a compilation album of the Meters' early works, music critic Robert Christgau called Modeliste's drumming "the secret" adding "it's almost as if he's the lead". In 2016 he was listed as the 18th best drummer of all time by Rolling Stone magazine. In describing his drumming style, in 2008 Modeliste said, "It's just a collage of all the drummers that I heard play in my lifetime from [New Orleans]."

Modeliste's work is credited on hundreds of recordings by a variety of artists. His drum patterns have been sampled extensively by hip hop artists such as Run DMC, Public Enemy, Beastie Boys, Ice Cube, LL Cool J, Queen Latifah and Salt-N-Pepa. His performances have been featured in film, television and game soundtracks, including Red, Jackie Brown, Drumline and 8 Mile. Modeliste is a Vic Firth, DW, and Sabian signature artist.

== Discography ==
=== Solo ===
- Zigaboo.com (JZM, 2000)
- I'm On the Right Track (JZM, 2004)
- Funk Me Hard Live (JZM, 2009)
- New Life (JZM, 2011)

=== With The Meters ===
- The Meters (Josie, 1969)
- Look-Ka Py Py (Josie, 1970)
- Struttin' (Josie, 1970)
- Cabbage Alley (Reprise, 1972)
- Rejuvenation (Reprise, 1974)
- Cissy Strut (Island, 1974)
- Fire on the Bayou (Reprise, 1975)
- The Best of The Meters (Mardi Gras, Virgo, 1975)
- Trick Bag (Reprise, 1976)
- New Directions (Warner Bros., 1977)
- Good Old Funky Music (Rounder, 1990)
- Funky Miracle (Charly, 1991)
- Uptown Rulers: The Meters live on the Queen Mary (Rhino, 1992)
- Live at the Moonwalker (Lakeside, 1993)
- Fundamentally Funky (Charly, 1994)
- Funkify Your Life: The Meters Anthology (Rhino, 1995)

=== As sideman ===
Credits partly adapted from AllMusic.

- Troublemaker (Mercury, 1979) with Ian McLagan
- Kristen Vigard (Private Music, 1988) with Kristen Vigard
- Storyville (Geffen, 1991) with Robbie Robertson
- She (Sony music entertainment, 1994) with Harry Connick Jr.
- Ekstasis (Axiom, 1993) with Nicky Skopelitis and Bill Laswell
- South Delta Space Age (Antilles, 1995) with Third Rail (James Blood Ulmer and Bill Laswell)
- (It Must've Been Ol') Santa Claus (Columbia, 1993) with Harry Connick, Jr.
- Buried Alive: Live in Maryland (2006) The New Barbarians (Ron Wood)
- Sneakin' Sally Through the Alley/Pressure Drop (2013) with Robert Palmer
- Toussaint: The Real Thing 1970-1975 (2015) with Allen Toussaint
- Another Side (2021) with Leo Nocentelli
- The Island Records Years (2023) with Robert Palmer

=== Instructional videos ===
- Zigaboo Modeliste: The Originator of New Orleans Funky Drumming (2012) DVD
