= The Meters =

American funk band

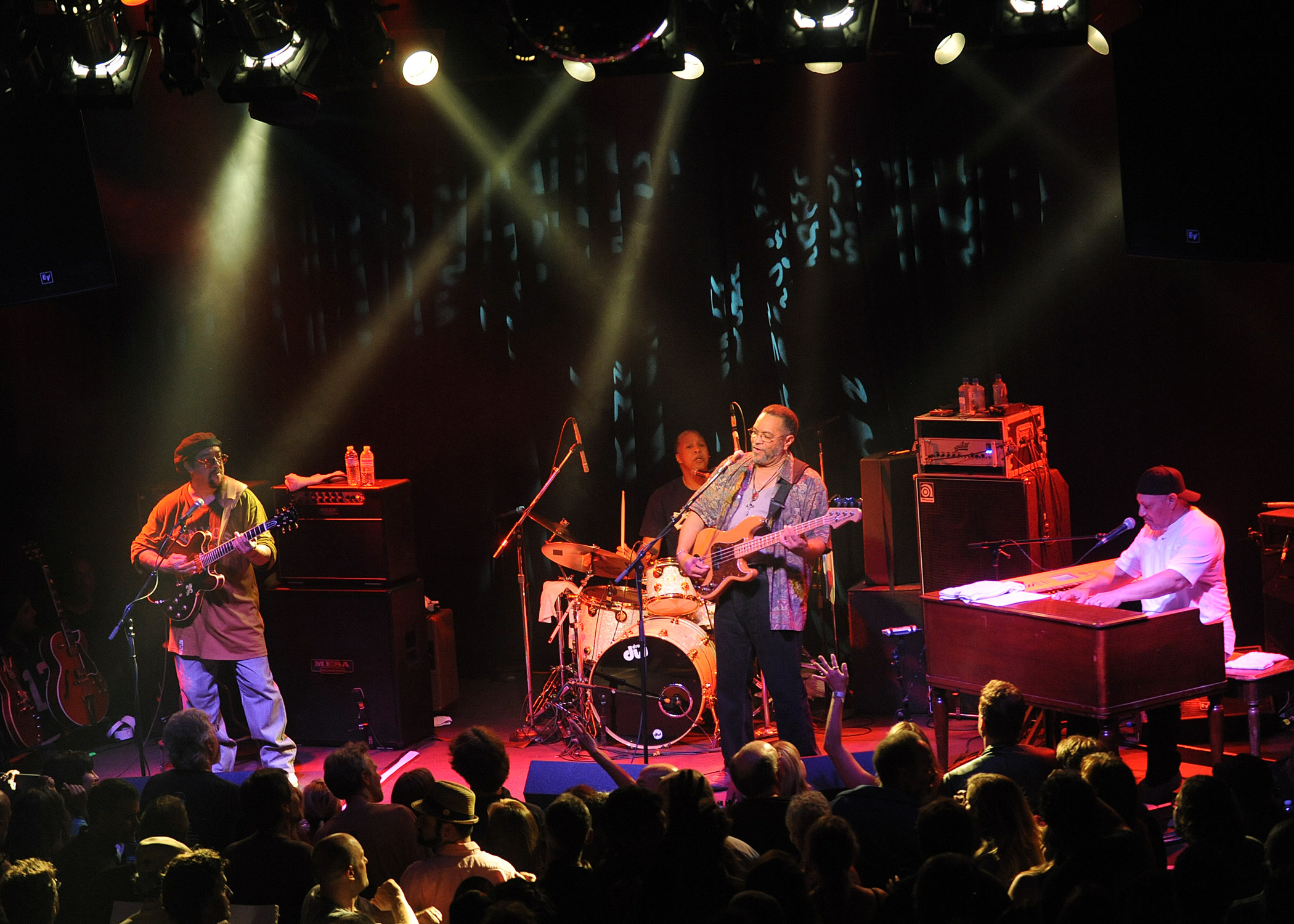
- The Meters performing in 2011

Background information
- Also known as: The Original Meters; The Funky Meters; The Meter Men
- Origin: New Orleans, Louisiana, U.S.
- Genres: Funk
- Years active: 1965–1977, 1989–2018, 2020–present
- Labels: Josie, Reprise, Mardi Gras, Virgo, Warner Bros., Rounder, Charly, Rhino, Lakeside, Sundazed, Too Funky
- Members: George Porter Jr.; Leo Nocentelli; Zigaboo Modeliste; Brian Stoltz; Terrence Houston
- Past members: Art Neville; Cyril Neville

The Meters (later The Funky Meters) are an American funk band formed in 1965 in New Orleans by Zigaboo Modeliste (drums), George Porter Jr. (bass), Leo Nocentelli (guitar) and Art Neville (keyboards). The band performed and recorded their own music from the late 1960s until 1977 and played an influential role as backing musicians for other artists, including Lee Dorsey, Robert Palmer, Dr. John, and Allen Toussaint. Their original songs "Cissy Strut" and "Look-Ka Py Py" are considered funk classics.

While they rarely enjoyed significant mainstream success, they are considered originators of funk along with artists like James Brown, and their work is influential on many other bands, both their contemporaries and modern musicians. Their sound is defined by a combination of tight melodic grooves and syncopated New Orleans "second line" rhythms under highly charged guitar and keyboard riffing. The band has been nominated four times for induction into the Rock and Roll Hall of Fame, most recently in 2017. In 2018 the band was presented with the Grammy Lifetime Achievement Award.

== History ==
=== 1960s–1970s ===
Art Neville, the group's frontman, launched a solo career around the New Orleans area in the mid-1950s while still in high school. The Meters formed in 1965 with a line-up of keyboardist and vocalist Art Neville, guitarist Leo Nocentelli, bassist George Porter Jr. and drummer Joseph "Zigaboo" Modeliste. They were joined later by percussionist-vocalist Cyril Neville. The Meters became the house band for Allen Toussaint and his record label, Sansu Enterprises.

In 1969 the Meters released "Sophisticated Cissy" and "Cissy Strut", both major R&B chart hits. "Look-Ka Py Py" and "Chicken Strut" were their hits the following year. After a label shift in 1972, the Meters had difficulty returning to the charts, but they worked with Dr. John, Paul McCartney, King Biscuit Boy, Labelle, Robert Palmer, and others.

In 1975 Paul McCartney invited the Meters to play at the release party for his Venus and Mars album aboard the Queen Mary in Long Beach, California. Mick Jagger of The Rolling Stones was in attendance at the event and was greatly taken with the Meters and their sound. The Rolling Stones invited the band to open for them on their Tour of the Americas '75 and Tour of Europe '76. In the same year the Meters recorded one of their most successful albums, Fire on the Bayou. From 1976 to 1977, they played in The Wild Tchoupitoulas with George and Amos Landry and The Neville Brothers.

Art and Cyril Neville left the band in early 1977, but The Meters still appeared on Saturday Night Live on March 19, 1977, during the show's second season. After the Nevilles' departure, David Batiste Sr. joined on keyboards and Willie West became the band's lead singer. Porter left the group later that year and by 1980 The Meters had officially broken up.

After the break-up, Neville continued his career as part of The Neville Brothers. Modeliste toured with Keith Richards and Ron Wood, while Nocentelli and Porter "became in-demand session players and formed new bands."

=== 1980s–1990s ===
In 1989 Art Neville, George Porter Jr., and Leo Nocentelli reunited as The Meters, adding drummer Russell Batiste Jr. to replace Zigaboo Modeliste. Nocentelli left the group in 1994 and was replaced with guitarist Brian Stoltz, formerly of The Neville Brothers. The band was renamed The Funky Meters. They were referred to as "the Funky Meters" as early as 1989. They were billed as such when playing in a tiny venue called Benny's Bar at Valence and Camp streets in New Orleans.

=== 2000s–2010s ===
The Funky Meters continued to play into the 2000s with Stoltz being replaced by Art Neville's son, Ian Neville, from 2007 to 2011 while Stoltz pursued a solo career. Stoltz returned to the band permanently in 2011.

In 2000 a large offer enticed all four original Meters to reunite for a one-night stand at the Warfield Theatre in San Francisco; by this time Modeliste wanted to make the reunion a permanent one, but the other members and their management teams objected. It wasn't until Quint Davis, producer and director of the New Orleans Jazz & Heritage Festival, got them to "put aside their differences and hammer out the details" and perform at the Festival in 2005.

In June 2011 The Original Meters along with Allen Toussaint and Dr. John played the Bonnaroo Music and Arts Festival in Manchester, Tennessee. The six men performed songs from Dr. John's album Desitively Bonnaroo which was originally recorded with the Meters, to a sold-out crowd. The Original Meters also played a set at the 2011 Voodoo Experience in New Orleans. On May 5, 2012 The Meters returned to New Orleans for a performance to a sold-out crowd at the Howlin' Wolf.

In late 2012, Zigaboo Modeliste, Leo Nocentelli, and George Porter Jr. played concerts with Phish keyboardist Page McConnell under the name The Meter Men. During his time off from Phish, McConnell has continued to play with Porter Jr., Nocentelli, and Modeliste under the moniker of The Meter Men since those shows in 2012. The Meter Men had performed 16 shows together as of spring 2015, with their third annual appearance as a late night act during New Orleans' Jazz and Heritage Festival. In 2014, during The Meter Men's second appearance as a late night act during Jazzfest, the band performed at The Republic on April 26, 2014, after McConnell had headlined the NOLA Jazzfest at the New Orleans Fairgrounds with Phish earlier that day. The Meter Men had also played the previous night at The Republic. As of spring 2015 The Meter Men appeared in Massachusetts, New York, Florida, Pennsylvania, Louisiana, Colorado, and Vermont. They also had a performance in Washington, D.C.

As of 2017, The Funky Meters toured consistently, performing songs by The Meters, while The Meters performed sporadically. The lineup of Neville, Porter, Nocentelli, and Modeliste typically billed themselves as The Original Meters to avoid confusion with The Funky Meters. When not performing with The Original Meters, guitarist Leo Nocentelli leads his own group, The Meters Experience, which also performs the music of The Meters.

The last performance of the original Meters (with all four of the founding members) was at the Arroyo Seco Festival in Pasadena, California on June 25, 2017.

Art Neville announced his retirement from music on December 18, 2018. Neville died on July 22, 2019.

== Influence ==
According to Brian Knight of The Vermont Review, "In a sense, the Meters defined the basic characteristics of the groove. While Funkadelic, Cameo, James Brown and Sly Stone are synonymous with funk, these artists look to the Meters for the basic-down to earthy and raw sound." Music critic Robert Christgau called the band "totally original" and placed the compilation album Funkify Your Life: The Meters Anthology on his list of top six New Orleans classics.

The Meters' music has been sampled by musicians around the world, including rap artists Heavy D, LL Cool J and Queen Latifah, Musiq, Big Daddy Kane, Run-DMC, N.W.A, Ice Cube, Scarface, Cypress Hill, EPMD, Public Enemy, A Tribe Called Quest, Beastie Boys, Naughty by Nature, and Tweet.

Red Hot Chili Peppers covered the Meters' song "Africa", renamed "Hollywood (Africa)", on their 1985 album Freaky Styley. The eclectic jazz-fusion guitarist Oz Noy has recorded his version of "Cissy Strut" twice. Primus covered the Meters' song "Tippi Toes" on their 1992 EP Miscellaneous Debris.

Bands such as the Grateful Dead, KVHW, Steve Kimock Band, Widespread Panic, Rebirth Brass Band, Galactic, Jaco Pastorius, and The String Cheese Incident have performed songs by The Meters in their concert rotations.

The song "They All Ask'd for You" from the 1975 album Fire on the Bayou remains popular in the New Orleans region and is the unofficial theme song of the Audubon Zoo.

== Awards and honors ==
- In 1970, The Meters were named Best Rhythm and Blues Instrumental Group by both Billboard and Record World magazines.
- The Meters have been nominated for the Rock and Roll Hall of Fame four times since becoming eligible in 1994: 1996, 2012, 2013 and 2017.
- George Porter Jr. and The Meters were recipients of the Lifetime Achievement Award at the second annual Jammy Awards in 2001.
- In 2011, the iconic Meters' song "Cissy Strut" was inducted into the Grammy Hall of Fame.
- In 2013, The Meters received a Lifetime Achievement Award from the Big Easy Music Awards.
- The band was featured on the 2017 New Orleans Jazz & Heritage Festival's commemorative poster.
- In January 2018, The Meters were honored with a Grammy Lifetime Achievement Award.

== Members ==
Current

- George Porter Jr. – bass, vocals (1965–1977, 1989–2018, 2020–present)
- Zigaboo Modeliste – drums, vocals (1965–1977, 2000–2018, 2020–present)
- Leo Nocentelli – guitar, background vocals (1966–1977, 1989–1994, 2000–2018, 2020–present)

Former

- Art Neville – keyboards, vocals (1965–1977, 1989–2018; died 2019)
- Gary Brown − saxophone (1965–1967)
- "Glen" − drums (1965)
- Cyril Neville – percussion, vocals (1970–1977)
- David Batiste Sr. – keyboards (1977–1980)
- Willie West – vocals (1977–1980)
- Russell Batiste Jr. – drums (1989–2000; died 2023)
- Brian Stoltz – guitar (1994–2000)
- Page McConnell − keyboards, background vocals (2012–2014)

=== The Funky Meters ===
- Art Neville – keyboards, vocals (2000–2016)
- George Porter Jr. – bass, background vocals (2000–2016)
- Brian Stoltz – guitar (2000–2007, 2011–2016)
- Ian Neville – guitar (2007–2011)
- Russell Batiste Jr. – drums (2000–2015)
- Terrence Houston – drums (2015–2016)

== Discography ==
Original studio albums

Year	Album	Chart positions		Label
Year	Album	US Pop	US R&B	Label
1969	The Meters	108	23	Josie JOS-4010
1969	Look-Ka Py Py	198	23	Josie JOS-4011
1970	Struttin'	200	32	Josie JOS-4012
1972	Cabbage Alley	—	48	Reprise MS-2076
1974	Rejuvenation	—	—	Reprise MS-2200
1975	Fire on the Bayou	179	41	Reprise MS-2228
1976	Trick Bag	—	—	Reprise MS-2252
1977	New Directions	—	—	Warner Bros. BS-3042
"—" denotes releases that did not chart.

Compilation albums

- Cissy Strut (1974), Island ILPS-9250 [LP]
- The Best of the Meters (1975), Virgo SV-12002 [LP]
- The Best of the Meters 71–75 (1976) Reprise (UK) K-54076 [LP]
- Second Line Strut (1980), Charly R&B CRB-1009 [LP]
- Here Come the Metermen (1986), Charly R&B CRB-1112 [LP]
- Struttin' (1987), Charly R&B CD-63
- Good Old Funky Music (1990), Rounder CD-2104
- Funky Miracle (1991), Charly CDNEV-2 [2-CD set]
- The Original Funkmasters (1992), Charly/Instant INS-5066
- Meters Jam (1992), Rounder CD-2105
- Fundamentally Funky (1994), Charly CPCD-8044
- Crescent City Groove Merchants (1994), Charly CPCD-8066
- Funkify Your Life: The Meters Anthology (1995), Rhino R2-71869 [2-CD set]
- Best of the Meters (1996), Mardi Gras MG-1029
- The Very Best of the Meters (1997), Rhino R2-72642
- Kickback (2001), Sundazed LP-5081; Sundazed SC-11081
- The Essentials (2002), Warner Strategic Marketing R2-76074
- Zony Mash (2003), Sundazed LP-5087; Sundazed SC-6211
- Here Comes the Meter Man (The Complete Josie Recordings 1968–1970) (2011), Charly SNAX627CD [2-CD set]
- Original Album Series (2014), Rhino 081227961565 [5-CD set], reissues: Cabbage Alley, Rejuvenation, Fire on the Bayou, Trick Bag, New Directions
- A Message from the Meters: The Complete Josie, Reprise & Warner Bros. Singles 1968–1977 (2016), Real Gone Music RGM-0491 [2-CD set]
- Gettin' Funkier All the Time: The Complete Josie/Reprise & Warner Recordings 1968–1977 (2020), Cherry Red/Soul Music Records QSMCR-5190BX [6-CD set, issued in a clamshell box]

Live albums

- Uptown Rulers: The Meters live on the Queen Mary (1975 [rel. 1992]), Rhino R2-70376
- Live at the Moonwalker (1993), Lakeside Music LAKE-2022 – as the 'Legendary Meters', featuring the J.B. Horns
- Second Helping (Live at the Moonwalker) (1994), Lakeside Music LAKE-2026 – as the 'Legendary Meters'
- Fiyo at the Fillmore, Volume 1 (2001 [rel. 2003]), Too Funky/Fuel 2000/Varese 030206127522 – as the 'Funky Meters'

Singles

Year	Single	Peak chart positions	
Year	Single	US Pop	US R&B
1968	"Sophisticated Cissy"	34	7
1969	"Cissy Strut"	23	4
1969	"Ease Back"	61	20
1969	"Dry Spell"	—	39
1970	"Look-Ka Py Py"	56	11
1970	"Chicken Strut"	50	11
1970	"Hand Clapping Song"	89	26
1970	"A Message from the Meters"	―	21
1971	"Stretch Your Rubber Band"	―	42
1971	"Doodle-Oop (The World Is a Little Bit Under the Weather)"	―	47
1971	"Good Old Funky Music"	―	—
1972	"Do the Dirt"	―	―
1972	"Cabbage Alley"	―	—
1972	"Chug Chug Chug-a-Lug (Push 'n' Shove)"	―	—
1974	"Hey Pocky A-Way"	―	31
1974	"People Say"	―	52
1975	"They All Ask'd for You"	―	—
1976	"Disco Is the Thing Today"	―	87
1976	"Trick Bag"	―	—
1977	"Be My Lady"	78	78
"—" denotes releases that did not chart.
