= Josie Records =

US record label

- Parent company: Jubilee Records
- Founded: 1954
- Defunct: 1971
- Genre: R&B, rock, jazz
- Country of origin: U.S.
- Location: New York City

Josie Records was a subsidiary of Jubilee Records in New York City that was active from 1954 to 1971.

The label's best selling bands were The Cadillacs ("Speedoo"), Bobby Freeman and the Meters.

Other hits for Josie Records included the Chips' "Rubber Biscuit" (immortalized many years later by the Blues Brothers), and J. Frank Wilson and the Cavaliers' version of Wayne Cochran's "Last Kiss".

== Discography ==
=== Josie Jazz Series ===
- JOZ-3500 - Gigi Gryce and Donald Byrd - Gigi Gryce & Donald Byrd - 1962
- JOZ-3501 - Cu-Bop - Art Blakey and Sabu Martinez - 1962 - Reissue of Jubilee JGM- 1049
- JOZ-3502 - Alto Saxophone - Herb Geller - 1962
- JOZ-3503 - Jackie McLean Quintet - Jackie McLean -1963 - with Donald Byrd, Doug Watkins, Ronald Tucker, Mal Waldron
- JOZ-3504 - Ray Draper Tuba Jazz - Ray Draper - 1963
- JOZ-3505 - Teddy Charles Trio Plays Duke Ellington - Teddy Charles - 1963
- JOZ-3506 - Med Flory Big Band - Med Flory - 1963
- JOZ-3507 - Jackie McLean Sextet - Jackie McLean - 1963
- JOZ-3508 - Mingus Three - Charles Mingus - 1963
- JOZ-3509 - Eddie Costa with the Burke Trio - Eddie Costa - 1963
