= Marshall Sehorn =

Marshall Estus Sehorn (June 25, 1934 – December 5, 2006) was an American A&R man, songwriter, music publisher and entrepreneur who played an important role in the development of R&B and popular music in New Orleans between the 1950s and 1970s, particularly as the business partner of record producer Allen Toussaint.

== Early years ==
He was born in Concord, North Carolina, and played guitar in local bands while attending North Carolina State University.

== Career ==
After graduating, he moved to New York City in 1958, and joined the A&R staff at Bobby Robinson's Fury and Fire record labels as their Southern promotions executive. He soon discovered singer Wilbert Harrison, whose recording of the Leiber and Stoller song "Kansas City" topped the US pop and R&B charts in 1959. The following year he secured another chart-topper for the Fire label, when he signed flamboyant New Orleans singer Bobby Marchan, who had a hit with "There's Something on Your Mind". He also discovered Lee Dorsey, pairing him with young songwriter and pianist Allen Toussaint, and helped secure hits for Gladys Knight & the Pips and Buster Brown. He ran sessions for the Fire and Fury labels in New Orleans, until the labels collapsed in 1963. He was credited as co-writer on many recordings including "One Way Out", which is usually credited to Sehorn and Elmore James.

Sehorn remained in New Orleans after the labels folded, and set up his own music publishing company, Rhinelander Music. He persuaded Toussaint to write new material for Lee Dorsey, which included "Ride Your Pony" and "Working in the Coal Mine", both of which became international hits. With Toussaint, he founded the Sansu record label, and signed singer Betty Harris. Harris' records for the label, including "Nearer To You", were among the first to feature the label's house band, who became The Meters. By the late 1960s, Sehorn and Toussaint had become "the most influential music-makers in New Orleans", and built the Sea-Saint Recording Studio in Gentilly. There they recorded such musicians as Dr. John, The Neville Brothers, and Labelle, whose "Lady Marmalade" was the studio's biggest hit. The studio also attracted Paul McCartney, whose 1975 Wings album Venus and Mars was largely recorded there.

== Legal history ==
Marshal Sehorn decided in the 1970s to get out of the actual producing and recording of music, and he entered into the licensing end of the business. He started multiple companies, including Blue Dog Express, Red Dog Express and White Dog Records by which he exploited the rights to music, some of which he did not own.

He attempted to acquire certain rights to the Chess Records catalogue but MCA Records exercised a superior claim to the titles in the Chess Records catalogue, and sued him for infringement in California. "In an action brought by MCA, the Los Angeles Superior Court determined that Red Dog and its owner, Marshall Sehorn, never in fact had any rights to the Chess Masters." MCA Records pursued another infringer Charly Holdings, Inc. Sehorn lost, and when he could not pay the judgment, he and his companies declared bankruptcy. The bankruptcy estate started a company called Gulf Coast Music to hold the titles to music in Sehorn's Express company catalogs. Gulf Coast Music then turned over titles of songs to artists like Betty Harris who had been denied royalties for decades by Sehorn. In bankruptcy, drummer Joseph Modeliste of The Meters sought to file a claim for assets of Sehorn's estate, but the Fifth Circuit Court of Appeals affirmed that Modeliste filed his claims with the bankruptcy court too late.

Sehorn had been sued before over unpaid royalties by artists like the Shirelles and B.J. Thomas.

== Death ==
Sehorn died in New Orleans of a respiratory disease in 2006, at the age of 72.
