= Leo Nocentelli =

American musician and songwriter (born 1946)

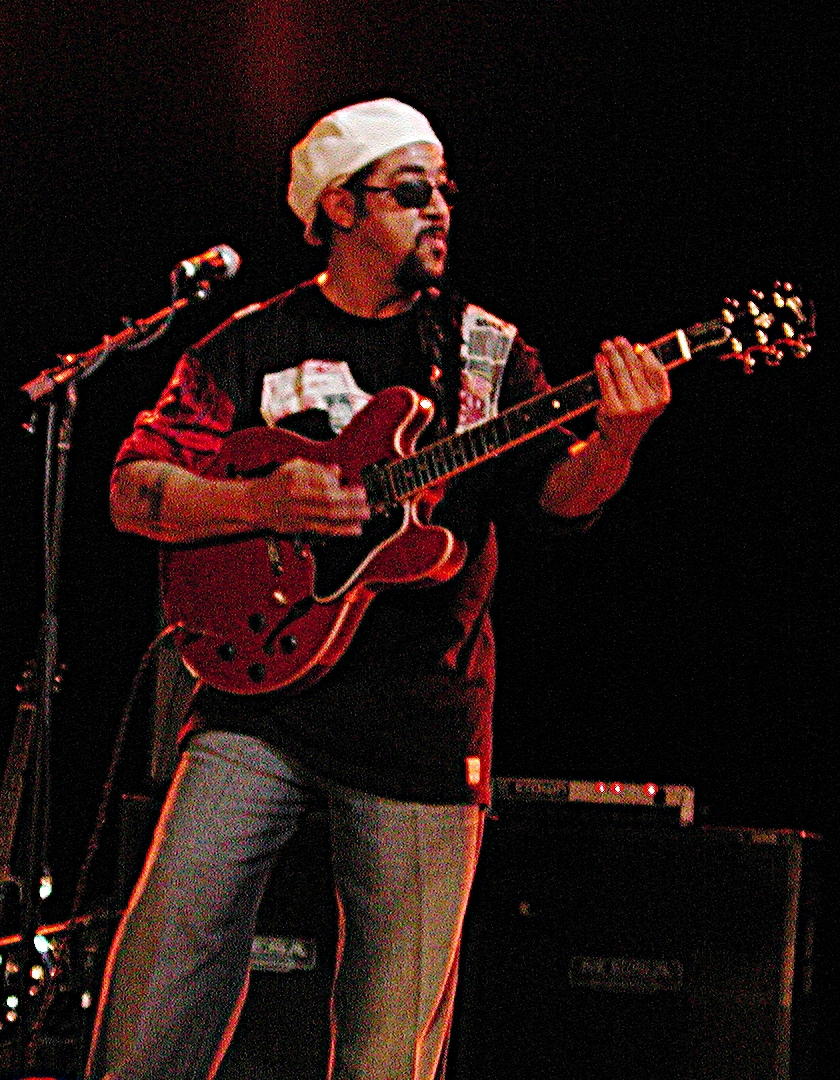
- Nocentelli in 2006

Background information
- Born: June 15, 1946 (age 80); New Orleans, Louisiana, U.S.
- Genres: Funk; R&B; soul; rock; jazz
- Occupations: Musician; songwriter
- Instrument: Guitar
- Years active: Late 1950s–present
- Member of: The Meters

Leo Nocentelli (born June 15, 1946) is an American musician and songwriter best known as a founding member and lead guitarist of the funk band the Meters. He wrote the original versions of several funk classics such as "Cissy Strut" and "Hey Pocky A-Way". As a session musician he has recorded with a variety of notable artists such as Dr. John, Robert Palmer and Etta James. He is the recipient of a Grammy Lifetime Achievement Award as a member of the Meters.

== Career ==
Nocentelli grew up in the Irish Channel and Seventh Ward neighborhoods of New Orleans. He was encouraged by his father to pursue music. He played ukulele at an early age and started on guitar at age twelve. He gravitated to jazz and was influenced by jazz guitarists Charlie Christian, Barney Kessel, Johnny Smith and Kenny Burrell. His first professional gig was at age thirteen. By age fourteen he was backing notable musicians such as Otis Redding and Clyde McPhatter. He played jazz, Dixieland, rhythm and blues, and rock. He joined the Hawketts and developed a reputation as a guitarist. At age seventeen he did session work for Motown acts including the Supremes, Temptations, and Spinners.

In 1964 he was drafted and served in the army for two years. During leaves he did session work in New Orleans. After the service he joined Art Neville and the Neville Sounds, at the time a recently founded seven-piece band. By 1968 the band consisted of four members: Nocentelli, Art Neville, George Porter, and Ziggy Modeliste. The band had a fluid style and each instrument was free to go anywhere musically. The band performed dance-style rhythm and blues at the Ivanhoe nightclub six nights a week. On Sundays, Nocentelli, Porter, and Modeliste performed jazz gigs. Nocentelli said his bandmates were his biggest influence and called his experience up to this point in time the learning phase of his career.

The band released two singles as the Meters, "Sophisticated Cissy" and "Cissy Strut", both originally written by Nocentelli. The commercial success of "Cissy Strut" became an impetus for the band's subsequent recording career as the Meters. From 1969 to 1977 the band released eight studio albums, with Nocentelli as one of the primary songwriters. He wrote the original versions of funk songs such as "People Say" and "Hey Pocky A-Way". Early on, improvisation was a major part of song development. Though the band gained notoriety in the music community, the lack of commercial success along with managerial and artistic factors gave way to their disbandment in late 1970s.

Throughout the 1960s and 1970s, Nocentelli wrote, co-wrote and did session work – mostly in Cosimo, Sansu, and Sea-Saint studios. As songwriter and producer, he learned from and was influenced by Allen Toussaint. He backed a variety of artists such as Dr. John, Robert Palmer, Albert King, Etta James, Joe Cocker, Earl King, Chris Kenner, and Betty Harris.

In 1971, Nocentelli recorded a solo debut album titled Another Side. He wrote the album during a brief span when the Meters were split up. Nocentelli sidelined the project because the Meters signed a record deal with Warner Records in 1972. The album was released years later in 2021.

In the early 1980s Nocentelli toured with Jimmy Buffett. He moved to Los Angeles in 1982. He continued to do session work and performed regularly with former bandmate George Porter as GEO/LEO. He also remained close with Modeliste, who had moved to the San Francisco Bay Area. They performed in various quartet formations and released a live album titled Nocentelli: Live in San Francisco. At one of their shows in 1989, Nocentelli and Porter invited Modeliste and Neville on stage. The impromptu performance was the first reunion of the original Meters. The same year Nocentelli, Neville, and Porter formed The Funky Meters with Russell Batiste on drums. Nocentelli performed with the reincarnated lineup until 1993.

He briefly moved back to New Orleans in the early 1990s and returned to Los Angeles in 1992. He continued to perform with two Meters-inspired lineups: The Meter Men and the Meters Experience. The Meter Men are Nocentelli, Porter, and Modeliste with Page McConnell on keyboards; variations included keyboardists Rich Vogel, John Gros, and drummer Russell Batiste. The Meters Experience is Nocentelli in various quartets with Bernie Worrell, Bill Dickens, Oteil Burbridge, Al Di Meola, Jason Crosby, George Laks, Albert Margolis, Jamal Batiste, Ricky Cortez, Felix Pollard, and others.

Early on, Nocentelli used a Gibson ES-175 hollow body guitar. He switched to a semi-hollow Fender Starcaster in mid-1970s. Around 2001 he switched to the semi-hollow Gibson ES-335. Nocentelli has performed in several reunions with the original Meters lineup. He moved to New Orleans in 2015 and continues to perform. He received a Grammy Lifetime Achievement Award in 2018 as a member of the Meters.

== Style ==
Nocentelli was self-taught. In his early teens he emulated jazz guitarists while listening to phonograph records. He was drawn to jazz, but to survive professionally he had to become proficient in multiple genres. In 1960s and 1970s he was part of an era in which New Orleans jazz gave way to rhythm and blues, and funk. Nocentelli's band, The Meters, were innovative and set the stylistic tone of New Orleans funk. The band's early works were rooted in improvisation. According to Nocentelli, genres are relative and he alludes to incorporating different genres in his style. He said in funk as well as in rhythm guitar you have to complement and react to what you hear, and said that is not a teachable skill. In addition to live performance and session work, songwriting was a significant part of Nocentelli's contribution.

== Discography ==
=== Solo albums ===
- Nocentelli: Live in San Francisco (DJM, 1997)
- Rhythm & Rhymes Part 1 (TLB, 2009)
- Another Side (Light in the Attic, 2021), lost solo album, written in 1971, released in 2021

=== With others ===
Credits partly adapted from AllMusic.

- In the Right Place (Atco, 1973) with Dr. John
- Nightbirds (Epic, 1974) with Labelle
- Sneakin' Sally Through the Alley (Island, 1974) with Robert Palmer
- Desitively Bonnaroo (Atco, 1974) with Dr. John
- Keep On Lovin' You (United Artists, 1975) with Z. Z. Hill
- Phoenix (Epic, 1975) with Labelle
- The Wild Tchoupitoulas (Mango, 1976) with The Wild Tchoupitoulas
- Patti LaBelle (Epic, 1977) with Patti LaBelle
- New Orleans Heat (Tomato, 1978) with Albert King
- Peaceful (Marina, 1978) with Al Johnson
- Tasty (Epic, 1978) with Patti LaBelle
- Changes (MCA, 1980) with Etta James
- Fiyo on the Bayou (A&M, 1981) with The Neville Brothers
- On My Way (Atlantic, 1982) with Gwen McCrae
- Experiment in White (Atlantic, 1982) with Janis Siegel
- On the Line (RCA, 1983) with Michael Wycoff
- Let My People Go (Quest, 1985) with The Winans
- Winner in You (MCA, 1986) with Patti LaBelle
- Tenderness (American Clave, 1990) with Kip Hanrahan
- Stickin' to My Guns (Island, 1990) with Etta James
- Victory Mixture (Orleans, 1990) with Willy DeVille
- Brother's Keeper (A&M, 1990) with The Neville Brothers
- Storyville (Geffen, 1991) with Robbie Robertson
- Solace (Arista, 1991) with Sarah McLachlan
- Us (Geffen, 1992) with Peter Gabriel
- Southern Exposure (Jive, 1993) with Maceo Parker
- There's Room for Us All (Black Top, 1993) with Terrance Simien
- Urban Blues Re: Newell (Sony Plain, 1995) with King Biscuit Boy
- Connected (NYNO, 1996) with Allen Toussaint
- Rock and Roll Doctor: Lowell George Tribute (CMC, 1997) with various artists
- Life, Love & the Blues (Private Music, 1998) with Etta James
- Matriarch of the Blues (Private Music, 2000) with Etta James
- Big Wide Grin (Sony, 2001) with Keb' Mo'
- Sing Me Back Home (Sony BMG, 2006) with New Orleans Social Club
- Maestro (Heads Up, 2008) with Taj Mahal
- The Dreamer (Verve, 2011) with Etta James
- Unlock Your Mind (Rounder, 2012) with The Soul Rebels
- Parking Lot Symphony (Blue Note, 2017) with Trombone Shorty
- Past Present, Future from The Big Ol' Nasty Getdown 'Volume 2' (Getdown Entertainment, 2018)
- All Together Now from The Big Ol' Nasty Getdown 'RepurposE Purpose - Volume 1' (Getdown Entertainment, 2024)
- o\i (Real World, 2026), with Peter Gabriel

== Instructional videos ==
- The Secrets of Funk: Using it and Fusing it ! (2003) – instructional DVD
