= George Porter Jr. =

American funk bass guitarist and singer (born 1947)

- Porter in 2024

Background information
- Born: December 26, 1947 (age 78); New Orleans, Louisiana, U.S.
- Genres: R&B; funk
- Occupations: Musician; songwriter
- Instruments: Bass; vocals
- Years active: 1965–present
- Labels: Rounder; Transvideo
- Website: georgeporterjr.com

George Porter Jr. (born December 26, 1947) is an American musician, best known as the bassist and singer of the Meters. Along with Art Neville, Porter formed the group in the mid-1960s and came to be recognized as one of the progenitors of funk. The Meters disbanded in 1977, but reformed in 1989. The original group played in occasional reunions, with the Funky Meters, of which Porter and Neville are members, "keeping the spirit alive" until Neville's retirement in 2018 and death the following year.

Porter has his own group, the Runnin' Pardners, and also other projects, such as The Trio with Johnny Vidacovich, New Orleans Social Club, Deep Fried, and Porter Batiste Stoltz. He has been performing and recording with a wide range of artists including Soul Rebels Brass Band, Dr. John, Paul McCartney, Robbie Robertson, Willy DeVille, Robert Palmer, Patti LaBelle, Jimmy Buffett, David Byrne, Johnny Adams, Harry Connick Jr., Earl King, Warren Haynes, Tori Amos, Snooks Eaglin and Dead & Company among many others.

Porter joined John Scofield's Piety Street Band in 2008 to tour and to record. Jon Cleary and Ricky Fataar are also members of this band. In 2010, he replaced Reed Mathis in Bill Kreutzmann's band, 7 Walkers. Also in 2010 he performed with Runnin' Pardner at New Orleans' Voodoo Experience.

== Biography ==
=== Early life and career with the Meters ===
Porter's parents were both avid lovers of music. His father frequently listened to Duke Ellington and his mother sang in the local church choir. He grew up in New Orleans next to future Meters bandmate, Joe "Zigaboo" Modeliste, and the two became friends when George was 10 years old. As teenagers, they played jam sessions together with Porter playing a box guitar. Porter was inspired to play bass guitar by another New Orleans native, Benjamin "Poppi" Francis who also gave Porter some lessons on the instrument. When Porter was still in his teens, he sat in with Earl King. After one of the shows, Art Neville came up to him saying he was trying to start a band and asked if he would like to join. Porter agreed spawning the beginnings of the Meters. At first the band was known as Neville Sound and consisted of seven men including Cyril and Aaron Neville as vocalists and Gary Brown on saxophone. After a short time, however, the band was trimmed down to four core members - Art Neville, Zigaboo Modeliste, Leo Nocentelli and Porter Jr. The four were playing six nights a week at a Bourbon Street bar called Ivanhoe when they were approached by Allen Toussaint and asked if they wanted to sign a record deal. After the deal, the label wanted the band to change their name to something that better reflected their sound. They settled on "The Meters." By the early seventies, Porter was touring coast to coast with the Meters. At the same time, the Meters were performing as session musicians on numerous hit records, including "Right Place, Wrong Time," "Lady Marmalade," "Sneakin' Sally Through the Alley," and "Southern Nights." In 1975, they were touring as the opening act to the Rolling Stones. Porter has said that the best moment in his musical career is when he and the other Meters were opening for the Stones in Paris in 1976. The crowd started to boo them, when Keith Richards and Mick Jagger came out in support of the Meters and told the crowd to shut up and listen to the music. He said that moment kept the Meters alive for the time being. By 1977, however, the band broke up due to personal differences. After the breakup, Porter Jr. formed a band called Joyride.

=== After the Meters ===
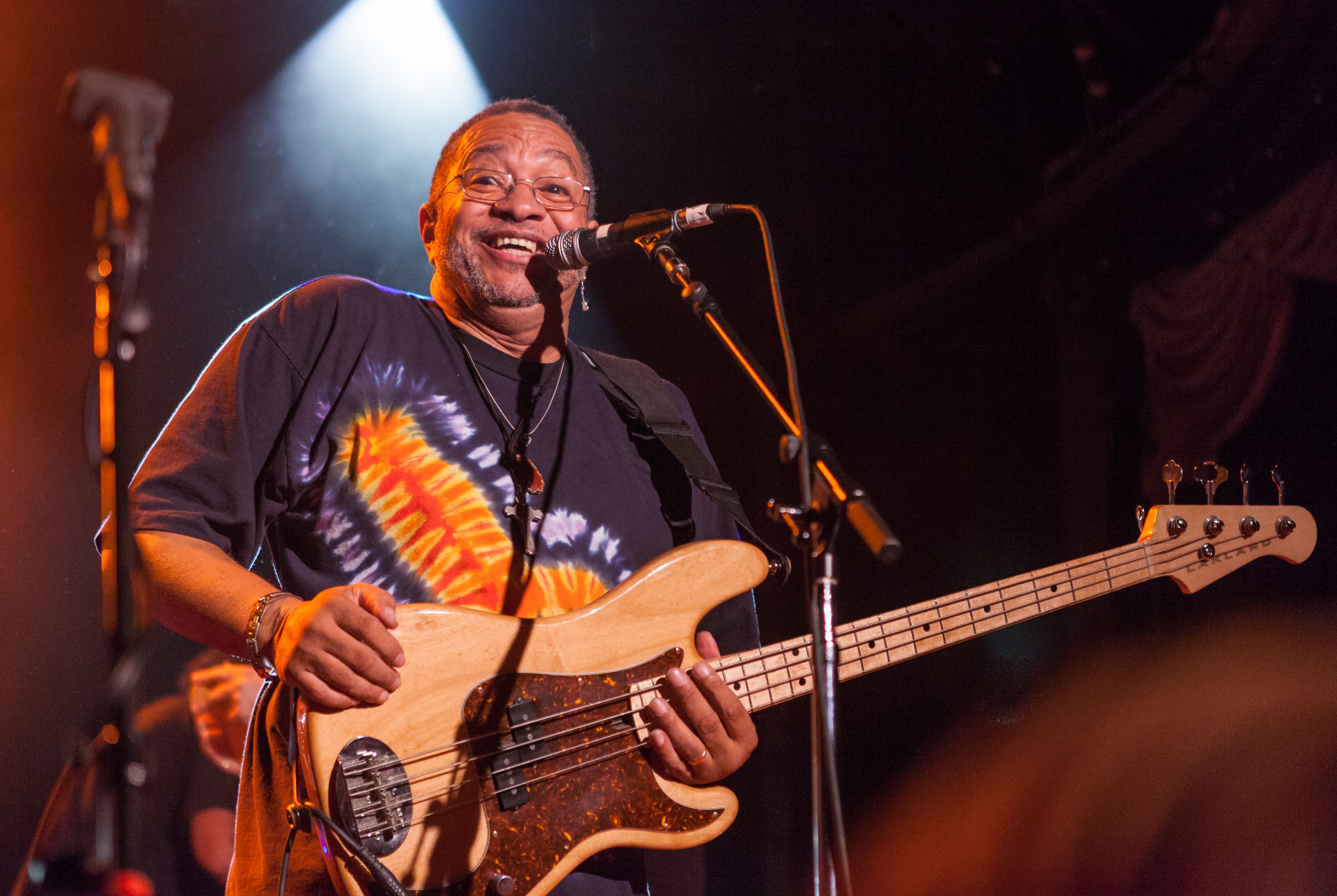
Porter performs at Bimbo's 365 Club, San Francisco, May 2011

Porter played with Joyride and with many other New Orleans musicians in the 1980s. In 1989, Porter reunited with Art Neville and Leo Nocentelli as the Meters, replacing Joe Modeliste on drums with Russell Batiste Jr. In 1990, he started a band called The Runnin' Pardners; a band that is still playing today. Also in the 1990s, Porter became a highly coveted bass player in the studio playing with artists like David Byrne and Tori Amos. In 1994, Porter and Neville re-collaborated to form the band The Funky Meters to carry on the Meters sound. They were joined by Brian Stoltz on guitar and Russell Batiste Jr. on drums. Stoltz left the band in 2007 but rejoined in 2011 and the band still plays today.

=== 2000 to present ===
In 2000, the original four Meters reunited for a show at the Warfield in San Francisco. Modeliste wanted to make the reunion a permanent one but the other members and their management objected. In 2006, however, the Meters performed at the New Orleans Jazz and Heritage Festival. This was the first Jazz Fest since Hurricane Katrina so the fact that the Meters reunited for it meant a lot to the city. In 2012, Porter, Leo Nocentelli, Joe Modeliste, and Phish keyboardist Page McConnell performed two concerts as The Metermen. Limited shows followed in 2013 and 2014 with two more night shows during Jazz Fest.

Porter appears in performance footage in the 2005 documentary film Make It Funky!, which presents a history of New Orleans music and its influence on rhythm and blues, rock and roll, funk and jazz. In the film, he performs with Snooks Eaglin and house band on "Come On (Let the Good Times Roll)", and is seen in clips with other musicians, including Art Neville.

Since Hurricane Katrina, Porter has done some activist work with other New Orleans musicians informing people of the dangers of eroding wetlands threatening the future of the city. Porter still tours consistently with the Runnin' Pardners, Joyride, and The Funky Meters. He plays sporadically with the four original members of the Meters, now known as The Original Meters and also frequently collaborates with other musicians, many of whom are from New Orleans. On February 24, 2018, Porter sat in with Dead & Company during their New Orleans concert at the Smoothie King Center, playing bass on several songs including "Smokestack Lightning", "Bertha" and taking lead vocals on "Sugaree".

He plays sporadically with Steve Kimock on various projects including Voodoo Dead.

== Personal life ==
Porter was raised Catholic, and once considered becoming a priest.

== Awards and honors ==
=== OffBeat's Best of The Beat Awards ===
Year	Category	Result	Ref.
1995	Best New Orleans Style R&B Band or Performer	Won	
1996	Best New Orleans Style R&B Band or Performer	Won	
1997	Best Bass Player	Won	
1998	Best Bass Player	Won	
1999	Best Bass Player	Won	
2000	Best Bass Player	Won	
2001	Best Bass Player	Won	
2002	Best Bass Player	Won	
2003	Best Bass Player	Won	
2004	Best Bass Player	Won	
2006	Best Bass Player	Won	
2008	Best Bass Player	Won	
2009	Best Bass Player	Won	
2010	Best Bass Player	Won	
2011	Lifetime Achievement in Music	Won	
2011	Best Bass Player	Won	
2012	Best Bass Player	Won	
2013	Best Bass Player	Won	
2015	Best R&B/Funk Band or Performer	Won	
2015	Best R&B/Funk Album (for It's Time to Funk)	Won	
2015	Best Bass Player	Won	
2016	Best Bass Player	Won	
2017	Best Bass Player	Won	
2018	Best Bass Player	Won	
2019	Best Bass Player	Won	
2020	Best Bass Player	Won	
2021-22	Best Bass Player	Won	
2023	Best Bass Player	Won	

== Discography ==
- Runnin' Partner (1990), Rounder
- Things Ain't What They Used to Be (1994)
- Count On You (1994) - Japan release
- Funk This (1997), Transvideo - EP
- Funk 'n' Go Nuts (2000), Transvideo
- We Came to Play (2003) - as Johnny Vidacovich, June Yamagishi and George Porter Jr.
- Searching for a Joyride (2005), Night Train
- Expanding the Funkin Universe (2007), OUW Records - as Porter Batiste Stoltz
- It's Life (2007), Transvideo
- Can't Beat the Funk (2011)
- Porter's Pocket (2025), Color Red

=== Collaborations ===
- In the Right Place - Dr. John (Atco Records, 1973)
- Sneakin' Sally Through the Alley - Robert Palmer (Island Records, 1974)
- Nightbirds - Labelle (Epic Records, 1974)
- Desitively Bonnaroo - Dr. John (Atco Records, 1974)
- Keep On Lovin' You - Z. Z. Hill (Hill Records, 1975)
- Phoenix - Labelle (Epic Records, 1975)
- Patti LaBelle - Patti LaBelle (Epic Records, 1977)
- New Orleans Heat - Albert King (Tomato Records, 1978)
- Hold On to Your Dream - The Staple Singers (20th Century Fox Records, 1981)
- Victory Mixture - Willy DeVille (Sky Ranch Records, 1990)
- Storyville - Robbie Robertson (Geffen, 1991)
- Uh-Oh - David Byrne (Warner Bros. Records, 1992)
- Soul of the Blues - Solomon Burke (Black Top Records, 1993)
- There's Room for Us All - Terrance Simien (Black Top Records, 1993)
- Under the Pink - Tori Amos (Atlantic Records, 1994)
- Boys for Pele - Tori Amos (Atlantic Records, 1996)
- From the Choirgirl Hotel - Tori Amos (Atlantic Records, 1998)
- Maestro - Taj Mahal (Heads Up, 2008)
- Bible Belt - Diane Birch (S-Curve Records, 2009)
- Let It Burn - Ruthie Foster (Blue Corn, 2011)
- Good Road to Follow - John Oates (Elektra Records, 2014)
- Miami Moon - Devon Allman (Create Records, 2024)
