= Art Neville =

American keyboardist, singer and songwriter (1937–2019)

- Neville in 2012

Background information
- Born: Arthur Lanon Neville Jr. December 17, 1937; New Orleans, Louisiana, U.S.
- Died: July 22, 2019 (aged 81) New Orleans, Louisiana
- Genres: Funk, R&B, soul
- Occupations: Singer, songwriter, bandleader
- Instruments: Vocals, keyboards
- Years active: Early 1950s–2018

Arthur Lanon Neville Jr. (December 17, 1937 – July 22, 2019) was an American singer, songwriter and keyboardist from New Orleans.

Neville was a staple of the New Orleans music scene for over five decades. He was the founder of the funk band The Meters whose musical style set the tone of New Orleans funk, a co-founder of the rock-soul-jazz band The Neville Brothers, and he later formed the spinoff group The Funky Meters. He performed on many recordings by notable artists from New Orleans and elsewhere, including Labelle (on "Lady Marmalade"), Paul McCartney, Lee Dorsey, Robert Palmer, Dr. John and Professor Longhair. He was the recipient of three Grammy awards.

== Life and career ==
Neville grew up in New Orleans. He was the son of Amelia (Landry) and Arthur Neville Sr. He started on piano and performed with his brothers at an early age. He was influenced by the R&B styles of James Booker, Bill Doggett, Booker T. Jones, Lloyd Glenn and Professor Longhair. In high school he joined and later led The Hawketts. In 1954 the band recorded "Mardi Gras Mambo" with Neville on vocals. The song gained popularity and became a New Orleans carnival anthem. The band toured with Larry Williams. Neville performed regularly in New Orleans, joined the U.S. Navy in 1958, and returned to music in 1962. He released several singles as a lead artist in 1950s and 1960s.

In the early 1960s Neville formed the Neville Sounds. The band included his brothers Aaron and Cyril, as well as George Porter, Leo Nocentelli, and Ziggy Modeliste. Shortly after, Aaron and Cyril left the group to form their own band. The remaining four members continued playing at the Nitecap and the Ivanhoe nightclubs. The band backed many notable artists such as Lee Dorsey, Betty Harris and The Pointer Sisters. The band had a strong sense of groove and unlike traditional groups each instrument was free to lead and go anywhere musically. Over time the band's style came to represent New Orleans funk.

In the late 1960s the band changed its name to The Meters and released three instrumental albums. Early on, compositions were through live improvisation; however, this changed in the early 1970s. The band gained notoriety in the rock music community including with musicians Paul McCartney, Robert Palmer and The Rolling Stones. The group released five more albums and disbanded in late 1970s due to financial, managerial and artistic factors. The band's musical style emphasized rhythm over melody and had a lasting impact on upcoming musical styles such as hip-hop as well as jam bands including Phish, Galactic and the Red Hot Chili Peppers.

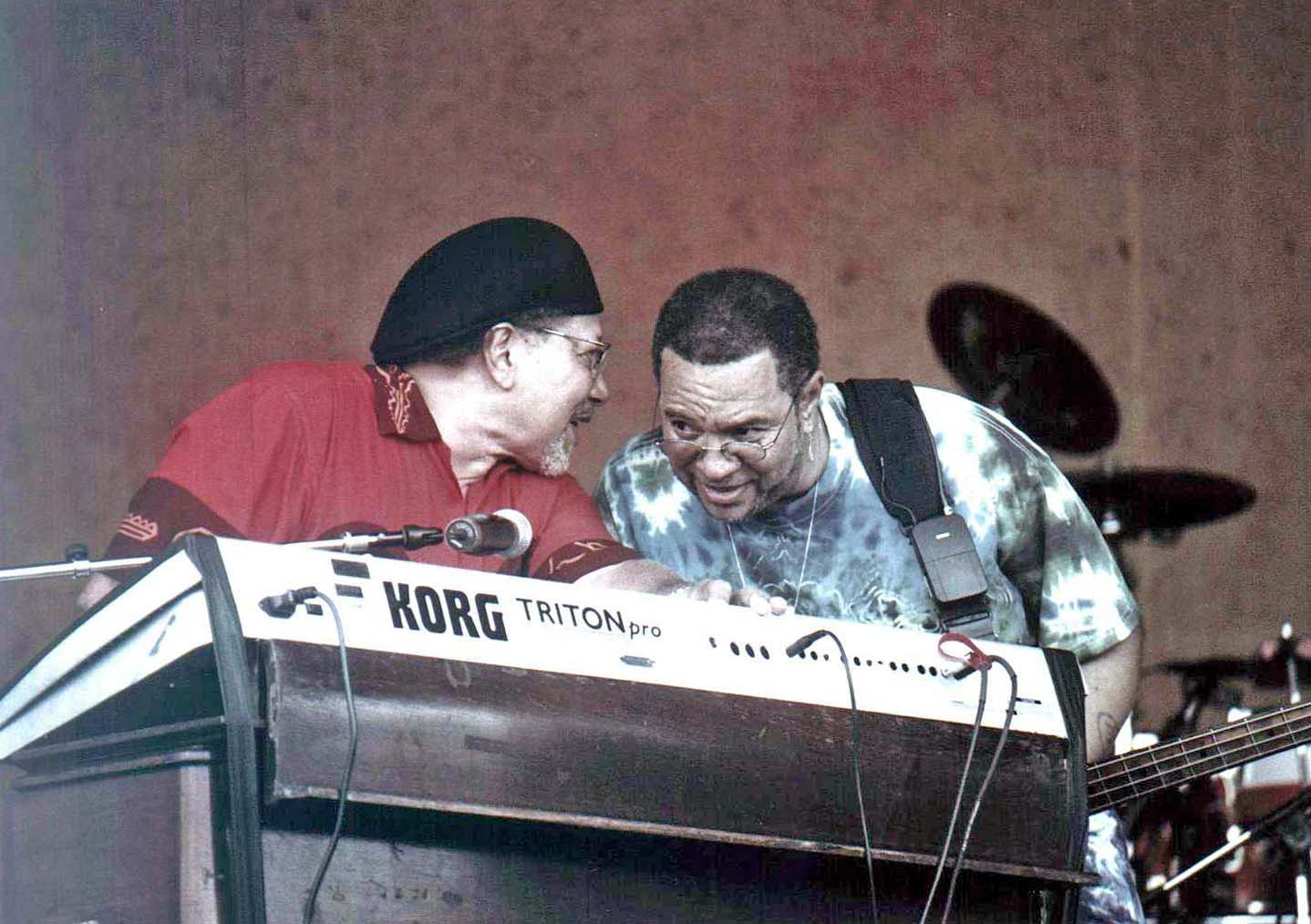
Neville (left) and George Porter Jr. of the Funky Meters at New Orleans Jazz & Heritage Festival 2004

In 1978 Neville and his brothers Cyril, Aaron and Charles formed The Neville Brothers. Previously, the brothers had worked on The Wild Tchoupitoulas album. The group's debut album, titled The Neville Brothers, was released in 1978. In 1981 music critic Stephen Holden wrote: the Neville Brothers' style of soul music combines "funk, doo-wop, reggae and salsa under the banner of New Orleans rhythm and blues". The group released several albums throughout the 1980s and 1990s, including Fiyo on the Bayou and Yellow Moon, and an album in 2004. During this period, Neville performed several shows with the original Meters bandmates including a 1989 reunion at the New Orleans Jazz Festival. Following that performance, Neville, Porter, Nocentelli and Russell Batiste formed The Funky Meters. The lineup changed in 1994 with Brian Stoltz replacing Nocentelli on guitar. Neville performed concurrently with both The Neville Brothers and The Funky Meters.

In a 1995 interview, Neville spoke about the joy of live improvisation. He said "The best part, to me, is when the [rhythm] just evolves into some other stuff." Neville received a Grammy in 1989 with The Neville Brothers for Best Pop Instrumental Performance. He received a Grammy in 1996 with various artists for Best Rock Instrumental Performance in "SRV Shuffle", a tribute to Stevie Ray Vaughan. He was nominated for a Grammy in 1999 in category Best Traditional R&B Vocal Performance. He received a Grammy Lifetime Achievement Award in 2018 as a member of The Meters.

Neville served as narrator, was interviewed on screen and appeared in performance footage in the 2005 documentary film Make It Funky!, which presents a history of New Orleans music and its influence on rhythm and blues, rock and roll, funk and jazz.

Neville retired from music in December 2018. He died in New Orleans at the age of 81 on July 22, 2019, after years of declining health. He was survived by his wife of thirty three years, Lorraine, three children, a sister and his two brothers Aaron and Cyril. The Recording Academy and Louisiana governor John B. Edwards released statements in recognition of Neville's contributions to New Orleans music.

== Personal life ==
Neville was married to wife Lorraine and they had two children, Ian and Amelia. Arthel Neville, born from first wife Doris Neville, is a journalist, television personality and news anchor for Fox News. Ian Neville is a guitar player and a founding member of Dumpstaphunk, a New Orleans–based funk and jam band. He occasionally performed with The Funky Meters, Slightly Stoopid, and Dr. Klaw.

== Discography ==
=== Singles ===
Adapted from Discogs.

- 1955 "Mardi Gras Mambo" / "Your Time's Up" (Chess 1591) (with the Hawketts)
- 1957 "Oooh-Whee Baby" / "The Whiffenpoof Song" (Specialty 592)
- 1958 "Cha Dooky Do" / "Zing Zing" (Specialty 637)
- 1959 "What's Going On" / "Arabian Love Call" (Specialty 656)
- 1961 "Too Much" / "That Rock 'n' Roll Beat" (Instant 3236)
- 1962 "All These Things" / "Come Back Love" (Instant 3246)
- 1963 "You Won't Do Right" / "Skeet Skat" (Instant 3256)
- 1963 "Lover of Love (Part 1)" / "Lover of Love (Part 2)" (Cinderella 1201)
- 1965 "My Babe" / "My Dear Dearest Darling" (Cinderella 1400)
- 1965 "My Dear Dearest Darling" / "Little Liza Jane" (Cinderella 1401)
- 1966 "Buy Me A Rainbow" / "Hook Line and Sinker" (Instant 3276)
- 1966 "House on The Hill (Rock 'n' Roll Hootenanny" / "Darling, Don't Leave Me This Way" (Instant 3281) (rumored to exist)
- 1968 "Bo Diddley (part 1)" / "Bo Diddley (part 2)" (Sansu 481) (with The Meters)
- 1968 "Heartaches" / "I'm Gonna Put Some Hurt On You" (Sansu 482) (with The Meters)

=== Other contributions ===
- 2007 Goin' Home: A Tribute to Fats Domino (Vanguard)
