= List of Y Combinator startups =

The following notable startups have completed the Y Combinator Accelerator program.

In 2015, Mike Isaac described Y Combinator as: "Y Combinator accepts batches of start-ups twice a year in a semester-like system and gives them money, advice and access to a vast network of start-up founders and technologists who can advise them." Since Fall 2024, Y Combinator has accepted four batches of startups per year.

== 2005−2010 ==
- 1000Memories
- 280 North
- Airbnb
- Biographicon
- Bump
- Clustrix
- Disqus
- Dropbox
- Ginkgo Bioworks
- Heroku
- Homejoy
- Justin.tv
- Listia
- Loopt
- Mixpanel
- NewsBlur
- Ninite
- Octopart
- OMGPop
- Optimizely
- OwnLocal
- PagerDuty
- Parakey
- Poll Everywhere
- Posterous
- Recurse Center (Hacker School)
- Reddit
- RethinkDB
- Scribd
- SIRUM
- Songkick
- Stripe
- Quora
- Virtualmin
- Vote.org
- WakeMate
- Weebly
- WePay
- Xobni
- YouOS
- Zenter

== 2011-2015 ==
- 7 Cups
- 80,000 Hours
- 9GAG
- AirPair
- Airware
- Algolia
- Bellabeat
- Benchling
- Bitnami
- Bluesmart
- Boosted
- BufferBox
- Casetext
- Canopy Labs
- Chaldal.com
- Circle
- Codecademy
- Cofactor Genomics
- Coinbase
- Container Linux (CoreOS Linux)
- CrowdMed
- Creative Market
- Cruise (autonomous vehicle)
- Diaspora
- DoorDash
- Double Robotics
- drchrono
- EquipmentShare
- Exec
- Experiment
- Firebase
- Flexport
- Fullstack Academy
- Gigster
- GitLab
- Goldbelly
- Gusto
- Hackpad
- HackerRank
- Helion Energy
- Humble Bundle
- Instacart
- Kamcord
- Kickback
- Lanyrd
- LeadGenius
- LendUp
- LightTable
- Lumi
- Matterport
- MemSQL
- Meesho
- Meteor
- Move Loot
- Mux
- New Story
- Oklo Inc.
- Opentrons
- OrderAhead
- Parse
- Paribus
- PatientBank
- Paystack
- Pebble (watch)
- PlanGrid
- Platzi
- Podium
- Product Hunt
- Quartzy
- Rigetti Computing
- Science Exchange
- SmartAsset
- Socialcam
- Streak
- Strikingly
- Swiftype
- Teespring
- The Muse (The Daily Muse)
- Tilt.com
- True Link
- uBiome
- Unbabel
- Upverter
- Verbling
- Watsi
- Webflow
- Wefunder
- Zapier
- TriNet Zenefits
- ZeroCater
- Zesty

== 2016−2020 ==
- Afriex
- AlpacaDB
- Boom Technology
- Brex
- Coub
- Deel Inc.
- Flock Safety
- Grey
- Legalist
- LendEDU
- Lezzoo
- Modal Commerce (Drive Motors)
- Momentus space
- Netomi (msg.ai)
- Our World in Data
- OpenSea
- Quicknode
- Rappi
- Replit
- Scale AI
- Sixa
- Skip
- Solugen
- Tara AI
- The Athletic
- The Good Food Institute
- Upsolve
- Women Who Code
- Writesonic
- Yotta Technologies

== 2021–2025 ==
- Alba Orbital
- Corgi
- Starcloud
- SyntheticFi
- Turing College (edtech company)
