= Listia (disambiguation) =

Listia is an online marketplace.

Listia may also refer to:

- Listia (nematode), a genus of roundworms in the family Camacolaimidae
- Listia (plant), a genus of plants in the family Fabaceae
