= Kickback =

Kickback, The Kickback or Kick Back can refer to:

== Mechanical movement ==
- Steering kickback, movement in a vehicle's steering wheel when it encounters an obstacle
- Table saw kickback, when part of the workpiece is propelled back towards the operator at a high speed
- Kickback, another term for recoil in a gun
- Kickback, a ball-saving mechanism in a pinball table
- Chainsaw kickback, in which a chainsaw encounters hard wood and violently surges upward

== Payment ==
- Kickback (finance), a form of bribery in which payment is received for services rendered
- Kickback, a bidding convention in contract bridge

== Entertainment ==
=== Music ===
- The Kickback (band), a band from Vermillion, South Dakota
- Kick Back (EP), a 2021 EP by WayV
- "Kick Back" (song), by Kenshi Yonezu, 2022
- The Kickback (album), a 2011 album by Cali Swag District
- Kickback (album), a 2001 album by The Meters

=== Other uses ===
- The Kickback (film), a 1922 film
- Kickback (video game platform), an online gaming site
- "Kickback" (The Professionals), a television episode
- Kickback (Transformers), a character that is part of The Transformers toy line

== Other ==
- Kh-15, a Russian air-to-surface missile also known by its NATO reporting name "Kickback"
