= Hermes Agent =

Open-source autonomous AI agent software

- Hermes Agent dashboard
- Developer: Nous Research
- Release: February 2026; 9 months ago
- Written in: Python
- Operating system: Linux, macOS, Windows
- Type: AI agent
- License: MIT License
- Website: hermes-agent.nousresearch.com
- Repository: github.com/NousResearch/hermes-agent

Hermes Agent is a free and open-source autonomous AI agent developed by the American artificial intelligence company Nous Research. First released in February 2026 under the MIT License, it runs on a user's own computer or server and carries out multi-step tasks using a large language model selected by the user. Users interact with it through a command-line interface, a desktop application called Hermes Desktop, or messaging services such as Telegram, Discord and Slack. The software records approaches that worked as reusable "skill" documents, which it can draw on in later sessions.

== History ==
Nous Research was founded in 2023 by Jeffrey Quesnelle, Karan Malhotra, Ryan Teknium and Shivani Mitra, and its early work included fine-tuning Meta's Llama language models. The company released Hermes Agent in February 2026, a few weeks after the open-source agent OpenClaw had drawn wide attention, and the two projects have been described as competitors. Coverage at launch focused on the agent's multi-level memory and its ability to keep working in a remote terminal session after the user disconnects.

For its first months, Hermes Agent could only be run from a terminal, and the graphical interfaces available were unofficial ones built by its user community. On June 2, 2026, Nous Research released Hermes Desktop, an official application for macOS, Windows and Linux, as a public preview.

In July 2026, TechCrunch reported that the project's GitHub repository had about 214,000 stars and nearly 40,000 forks, and that Nous Research was finalizing a funding round of at least US$75 million, led by Robot Ventures, at a valuation of $1.5 billion. On October 7, 2026, the company announced that it had raised $90 million from investors including Nvidia, Microsoft's M12, Samsung, Robot Ventures, Union Square Ventures, Y Combinator and Menlo Ventures, and that the money would fund Hermes for Businesses, a version of the agent aimed at companies. The Wall Street Journal reported the valuation as $1.5 billion. Nous Research said that the software had been cloned more than 24 million times since its release.

== Features ==
Hermes Agent ships with built-in skills that include web search, coding and image understanding, and it is designed to create further skills from the tasks it completes, without manual intervention. Skills are stored as searchable Markdown documents. The agent also keeps persistent memory of a user's projects and of solutions it has previously found, can schedule recurring tasks described in natural language, and can delegate work to sub-agents that run in parallel with their own terminals.

Commands issued by the agent can be executed through one of five backends: the local machine, Docker, SSH, Singularity or Modal. The same agent can be reached through Telegram, Discord, Slack, WhatsApp, Signal and email as well as the terminal.

The software is not tied to a particular language model. Techzine contrasted this with Claude Code and Codex, which are built around their developers' own models.

=== Related products ===
Hermes Desktop is a graphical front end to the agent. It is built with Electron and React on a Python backend, and uses the same agent core, memory, skills and configuration as the command-line version.

Nous Portal is a separate service through which Nous Research sells access to more than 300 language models, with a free tier and paid plans. The company also offers a cloud-hosted version of the agent priced from $20 to $200 per month. Hermes for Businesses, announced in October 2026, is a planned commercial version for organizations.

Third parties also package the software. In May 2026 an installation script was added to the Proxmox VE Community Scripts collection, which deploys Hermes Agent in an LXC container on Proxmox Virtual Environment.

== Security ==
Because Hermes Agent can run shell commands and modify files on the system where it is installed, its security has drawn attention from researchers. An independent audit of version 0.8.0, published by an outside researcher on the project's issue tracker on April 11, 2026, reported four critical and nine high-severity findings in the default configuration. They included shell-command checks that relied only on regular expressions, approval prompts that were skipped when the agent ran inside a container, and the possibility of persistently injecting malicious skills.

In a research note published in May 2026, the Cloud Security Alliance listed three CVE identifiers then assigned to the software: a path traversal flaw in its WeChat Work messaging adapter (CVE-2026-7396), a symbolic link flaw in its file tools that was fixed in version 0.9.0 (CVE-2026-7397), and a path traversal flaw in hermes-webui, a related web interface, that was fixed in that project's version 0.50.34 (CVE-2026-6829). The note recommended that organizations upgrade, run the agent in a container or virtual machine rather than on a privileged workstation, and install skills only from a vetted source.

Further CVE identifiers were assigned later in 2026, among them CVE-2026-9354, concerning output handling in the Slack and Mattermost adapters, and CVE-2026-14625, concerning the command execution function of the terminal interface gateway in versions up to 0.15.2. The published record for another, CVE-2026-10221, states that the vendor was contacted before disclosure and did not respond.

The project's security policy describes Hermes Agent as a single-tenant personal agent and states that isolation at the operating-system level is the only boundary it relies on against a language model behaving adversarially.

== Reception ==
Writing for Decrypt in June 2026, Jose Antonio Lanz called OpenClaw the main open-source rival to Hermes Agent and wrote that Hermes had the more interesting architecture but had been harder to run, since OpenClaw already offered a graphical interface. Erik van Klinken of Techzine wrote in July 2026 that the popularity of Hermes suggested that agents built around skills were winning out over OpenClaw's approach.

== See also ==
- OpenClaw
- Agentic AI
- List of free and open-source software packages
