= Pulseway =

- Type: RMM Software
- Inventor: Marius Mihalec
- Inception: 2011
- Manufacturer: MMSOFT Design Limited
- Website: www.pulseway.com

Pulseway, previously Mobile PC Monitor, is a mobile-first IT management software designed and developed by MMSOFT Design Limited.

== History ==
Pulseway, previously Mobile PC Monitor, was founded by Marius Mihalec in Dublin, Ireland in 2011. Since launching, Pulseway's technology reportedly grew in popularity amongst system administrators, IT consultants and managed services providers (MSP's) to reach over 300,000 users worldwide.

In January 2014, Pulseway announced integrations with PagerDuty to create SMS and phone notifications and Zendesk to automatically create tickets based on Pulseway's notification criteria. In January 2014, Pulseway integrated with Autotask. In April 2015, Pulseway launched its Remote Desktop tool. In August 2016, Pulseway launched a Professional Services Automation (PSA) solution.

== Mobile app ==
Pulseway was initially designed as a mobile application, with all remote management functions being handled through a mobile device. The app is available across all platforms including iOS, Android, Windows and Windows Phone.
