= SquarEat =

United States food company

SquarEat Limited Liability Company is an inactive Florida-based American healthy food company that sold food packaged as small square blocks. The size and shape of the 45-gram food portions were the same for all the various packaged foods, regardless of contents. The company sold them as meal boxes consisting of six squares. As of November 2024, the SquarEats site is offline, and the business appears to be defunct. The Wefunder page remains up, with the most recent update posted on March 13, 2025, by CEO Paolo Cadegiani. The update states that they have temporarily paused operations due to high shipping costs.
