= Chris Sacca =

American businessman

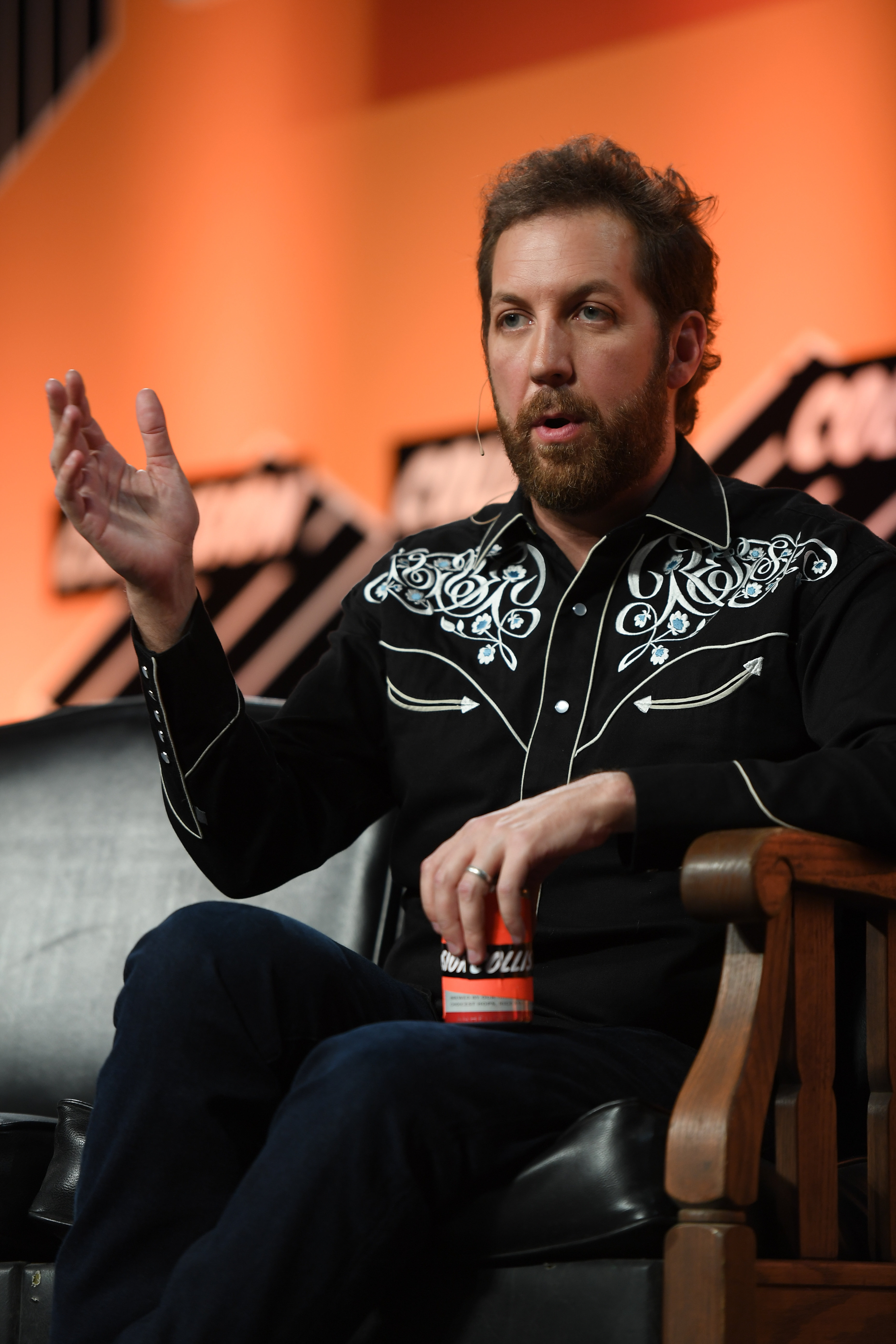
- Sacca in 2017
- Born: Christopher Sacca; May 12, 1975 (age 51); Lockport, New York, U.S.
- Education: Georgetown University (BS, JD)
- Occupations: Angel investor, founder of Lowercase Capital
- Spouse: Crystal English Sacca
- Children: 3

Christopher Sacca (born May 12, 1975) is an American venture investor, company advisor, entrepreneur, and lawyer. He is the proprietor of Lowercase Capital, a venture capital fund in the United States that has invested in seed and early-stage technology companies such as Twitter, Uber, Instagram, Twilio, and Kickstarter, investments that resulted in his placement as No. 2 on Forbes' Midas List: Top Tech Investors for 2017. Sacca held several positions at Google Inc., where he led the alternative access and wireless divisions and worked on mergers and acquisitions. Between 2015 and 2020, he appeared as a "Guest Shark" on ABC's Shark Tank. In early 2017, Sacca announced that he was retiring from venture investing. In 2021, Sacca announced that he was back into venture investing with a focus on climate issues.

== Early life and education ==
Chris Sacca was born on May 12, 1975, and raised in Lockport, a suburb of Buffalo. His father was an attorney, while his mother was a professor at SUNY Buffalo State. Sacca is of Irish and Italian descent, with family originating from Calabria, Italy. Sacca's parents exposed him to a variety of interests, and he recalls being pulled out of school to attend science museums and book-readings. His brother is actor Brian Sacca.

Sacca attended The Edmund A. Walsh School of Foreign Service at Georgetown University in Washington, D.C. He spent semesters abroad at the Pontificia Universidad Católica del Ecuador in Quito, Ecuador, University College Cork, in Cork, Ireland, and the Universidad Complutense in Madrid, Spain. He graduated in 1997 cum laude with a B.S. in foreign service and was an Edmund Evans Memorial Scholar as well as a Weeks Family Foundation Scholar. He was a member of The Tax Lawyer law review and was honored as the school's Philip A. Ryan and Ralph J. Gilbert Memorial Scholar. He recalls that he managed to graduate without attending class, obtaining class notes by throwing an annual keg party where entry required classmates to dump their notes in a bin. He graduated from Georgetown University with a Juris Doctor cum laude in law and technology in 2000.

== Career ==
=== Stocks and Fenwick & West ===
Sacca used his student loans to start a company during law school, and when the venture proved unsuccessful he used the remaining funds to start trading on the stock market. By leveraging trades for significant amounts (discovering a flaw in the software of online trading brokers in 1998) he managed to turn $10–20 thousand into $12 million by 2000. Eventually, when the market crashed, Sacca found himself in debt with a four million dollar negative balance. He negotiated to have it reduced to $2.125 million and had repaid it by February 2005.

In 2000 Sacca began his career as an associate at Fenwick & West in Silicon Valley where he handled venture capital, mergers, acquisitions, and licensing transactions for technology clients including Macromedia, VeriSign, and Kleiner Perkins. Laid off in September 2001, after approximately 13 months, he spent the next several months attending networking events and ‘surviving’ in Silicon Valley by drafting contracts and doing voice over work as a freelancer. Creating the consulting firm The Salinger Group for networking purposes, he landed at Speedera Networks in May 2002.

=== Google positions ===
In November 2003 Sacca was hired at Google as Corporate Counsel, where he reported to General Counsel David Drummond. As part of the legal and business development team, his first mandate was to find large amounts of data space, by negotiating and signing agreements around the world. Sacca served as Head of Special Initiatives at Google Inc. leading the alternative access and wireless divisions. Among his projects were the 700 MHz and TV white spaces spectrum initiatives, Google's data center in Oregon, and the free citywide WiFi network in Mountain View, California. Sacca also led many of Google's business development and mergers and acquisitions transactions and was on the founding team of the company's New Business Development organization. He was among the first Google employees given the Founders’ Award, the company's highest honor.

=== Angel investments ===
While at Google, Sacca began investing in companies as an angel investor. He served as a professional advisor to companies for a variety of matters, including strategy, optimizing user experience, raising money, and selling a company. His first angel investment was in Photobucket, which was then sold to News Corp in 2007. His second investment was in Twitter. Entrepreneur Evan Williams had started a microblogging service called Twttr in 2006, and asked Sacca if he wanted to invest. Sacca invested $25,000 and began using the service, registering in July 2006 as the 102nd user on the site. Sacca took part in a $5 million financing round for Twitter in late 2007 and ultimately created four separate funds to surreptitiously buy as many Twitter shares as possible. Sacca left Google in December 2007 after he had fully vested and sought additional opportunities to work with early-stage companies.

Sacca has stated that a turning point in his angel investing was in 2007, when he moved to the town of Truckee in the mountains close to Lake Tahoe. Entrepreneurs including Travis Kalanick and Sacca would spend hours discussing ideas at the residence, and Sacca eventually bought the house next door to host various visiting entrepreneurs. When money began to run low Sacca raised a new fund with investors such as Brad Feld, Marissa Mayer, Eric Schmidt, and JPMorgan Chase's Digital Growth Fund.

=== Lowercase Capital ===
Sacca founded Lowercase Capital LLC in Truckee California, in 2010 when he closed his Lowercase Ventures Fund I, an $8.4 million seed fund, in 2010, with investments in Uber, Docker, Optimizely, StyleSeat, Instagram, and Twitter. Lowercase also has some non-tech-related companies in its portfolio, including Blue Bottle Coffee Company and a high-end restaurant in Truckee. Without the corporate backup funding available to many venture capitalists, Sacca became very involved in his portfolio companies on a personal level. He attended meetings at Twitter and Uber, and he negotiated the rights for Uber.com from Universal Music Group when the company changed its name from Uber Taxi. Although not on Twitter's payroll, he served as an advisor

Through 2009 he invested in companies such as Kickstarter, Twilio and Lookout. Sacca opened a new $1 billion investment fund in the summer of 2010, and later that year the fund began to buy large blocks of shares from Twitter stockholders, deepening Sacca's position in the company. By February 2011 Sacca's funds had purchased about $400 million worth of Twitter shares, giving it "a stake of roughly 9 percent." When Twitter went public in late 2013, Sacca's affiliated funds owned almost 18% of the company, raising the value of Sacca's investment in the company to around $1 billion.

Sacca brought in Matt Mazzeo to Lowercase Capital as a partner in 2013, with Mazzeo heading a new early-stage fund, Lowercase Stampede, out of Los Angeles. Mazzeo had worked at Creative Artists Agency (CAA), an entertainment and sports agency. Sacca had a 4% stake in Uber by March 2015, and Lowercase was "sitting on" investments in Stripe, Lookout and WordPress parent Automattic. Forbes estimated that Sacca was personally worth $1.2 billion. By that time the value of his first Twitter fund, Lowercase Industry, had reached 1,500% of its original value, and his Twitter deals overall had "returned $5 billion to investors." Also in 2015, Forbes said that Sacca had built "the best seed portfolio in history" with funds such as his Lowercase Ventures Fund I, which had investments in companies such as Twitter, Instagram, and Uber. Fortune had also labeled Lowercase as one of the most successful venture capital funds in history.

Lowercase Capital had an investment portfolio of around 80 startups and a variety of more mature companies by 2017, including Medium and Uber. Sacca was fully divested from Twitter by 2017. That April, Sacca announced that he was retiring from venture investing and along with it his role on Shark Tank, saying he was "two years late" on his plan to retire at 40 years old. He said his firm would continue to support its portfolio companies, but would not take on any new investments or raise more money from investors.

=== Lowercarbon Capital ===
Sacca launched a climate change-related fund in 2020 called Lowercarbon Capital which was initially funded by Sacca and his wife. The firm announced its first outside funding round of $800 million in August 2021. The firm had invested in ~50 companies as of August 2021, many of which were startups focused on removing carbon dioxide from the air.

=== Shark Tank and media ===
Sacca regularly speaks about venture capital and investing in media. He has been characterized as an expert by Business Week, Fortune magazine, CNBC, the BBC, CNN, Fox and NPR. Sacca's interview in the first season of Gimlet Media's StartUp podcast inspired the pilot episode of the ABC television version of Start Up starring Zach Braff with Sacca playing himself. He played himself in the "Overton Window" episode of Billions.

He has also appeared on other television shows. In 2015 he first appeared as a "Guest Shark" in episode 4 of season 7 of the ABC reality television show Shark Tank, which dramatizes seed-stage investment negotiations. Subsequently, appearing in three other season 7 episodes, Sacca invested in HatchBaby, Bee Free Honee, Rent Like a Champion, and Brightwheel. Sacca continued to appear as a guest shark in five episodes of season 8. Among others, he invested in a business that opens lemonade stands, and on February 17, 2017 in episode 168, Sacca along with guest Lori Greiner invested $600,000 for 5% of ToyMail, a plush toy which connects to a messaging app. Sacca has a role in the ABC sitcom Alex, Inc., where he plays himself and reenacts his interactions with Alex Blumberg.

== Recognition ==
Since 2011 he has been listed on Forbes' Midas List: Top Tech Investors. In 2015, Sacca was featured on the cover of Forbes magazine listed as No. 3 on the Midas list. and in 2017, he was listed at No. 2. BusinessWeek named him one of the top 10 angel investors, and Vanity Fair has named Sacca to its "New Establishment" list.

== Personal life ==
Sacca's wife Crystal English Sacca is also a partner at Lowercase. She is a former advertising creative and has authored books such as The Essential Scratch and Sniff Guide to Becoming a Wine Expert: Take a Whiff of That and The Essential Scratch & Sniff Guide to Becoming a Whiskey Know-It-All: Know Your Booze Before you Choose. The couple live in Jackson, Wyoming and Big Sky, Montana, with their three children.

He is known in business circles for his Western-style shirts, which resulted in Sacca being named to GQ's "Worst Dressed List." At the University of Minnesota, Sacca delivered a 2011 commencement address that NPR ranked on its list of “Best Commencement Speeches, Ever." Sacca completed an Ironman in 2008, and in 2009 rode his bicycle from Santa Barbara, California to Charleston, South Carolina over 40 days for charity. In 2017 the New York Times reported that a woman had accused Sacca of touching her face at a Las Vegas gathering in 2009 without consent, making her uncomfortable. Sacca denied the allegation, but did apologize for contributing to a business atmosphere that was "inhospitable" for women in technology and venture capital.

=== Philanthropy ===
Sacca is involved with charity: water, a nonprofit seeking to bring clean drinking water to every person on the planet. He is also involved with The Tony Hawk Foundation. Sacca has served as an Associate Fellow of the Saïd Business School at Oxford University and as an MIT Enterprise Forum Global Trustee. He is also a Henry Crown Fellow of the Aspen Institute.

In 2019, the Saccas each signed The Giving Pledge, which calls upon signatories to donate the majority of their net worth to philanthropic causes.

=== Political involvement ===
Sacca worked for Barack Obama's 2008 presidential campaign as a Telecommunications, Media, and Technology advisor and campaign surrogate, as well as a field office volunteer. Following Obama's victory, Sacca served as co-chair of finance for the Presidential Inaugural Committee. During Obama's successful 2012 reelection campaign, Sacca served as a member of the campaign's National Finance Committee member and as co-chair of the "Tech for Obama" group.

During the 2016 U.S. presidential election, Sacca was a vocal supporter of Democratic Nominee Hillary Clinton, appearing in various fundraisers around the country. He spoke against Trump, and in response to President Donald Trump's 2017 executive order banning travel from seven predominantly Muslim nations, Sacca donated $150,000 in matching donations to ACLU. Sacca donated to the Lincoln Project, a Republican-led super PAC opposing the re-election of Donald Trump and Republican Senators who supported him.
