= Crystal English Sacca =

American venture capitalist

- Born: Crystal English
- Education: Georgetown University
- Occupations: Angel investor, partner of Lowercase Capital
- Known for: co-founder of Lowercarbon Capital
- Spouse: Chris Sacca
- Children: 3
- Website: CrystalEnglishSacca.com

Crystal English Sacca is an American venture investor and author. She is known for her work in advertising, her New York Times bestselling book, for being an early investor in Uber and Blue Bottle Coffee through Lowercase Capital, and for her philanthropy.

== Early life and education ==
Sacca attended the Edmund A. Walsh School of Foreign Service at Georgetown University. She graduated with a B.S. in Foreign Service.

== Career ==
=== Advertising and the arts ===
Through the early 2000s, Sacca worked in advertising, serving as art director to clients such as Audi, Intel, Barclays, HBO, Sprint, and Napster. She received a Cannes Lion, Two Gold Cannes Cyberlions, and other awards. She was named an ADC Young Gun, one of AdWeek’s "Best Creatives You Don’t Know."

More recently, she served as producer of the stage production of Mike Birbiglia’s The New One in 2018.

=== Investing ===
Sacca is a partner at angel investing fund Lowercase Capital and the co-founder of Lowercarbon Capital, a fund dedicated to environmental investing. She co-led early investments in companies including Uber and Blue Bottle.

More recent investments include Linear Labs, a producer of next-generation electric motors.

=== Books ===
Sacca has co-authored and designed books on wine and whiskey. Her 2013 wine book, The Essential Scratch & Sniff Guide to Becoming a Wine Expert, was a New York Times Bestseller.

The follow-up book, The Essential Scratch & Sniff Guide to Becoming a Whiskey Know-It-All, was published in 2015.

== Philanthropy and political activism ==
In 2019, Sacca was appointed to the Board of Trustees of the Cooper Hewitt, Smithsonian Design Museum.

She is a founding member of The Design Vanguard. The organization describes itself as dedicated to furthering a "more just and beautiful world" through the efforts of creative leaders.

In response to the Trump travel ban (a.k.a. "Muslim ban") of 2017, she produced her well-known "Everyone Welcome" painting.

She and spouse Chris Sacca have signed the Giving Pledge, committing to give a majority of their wealth to charity.

== Personal life ==
Sacca is the spouse of Chris Sacca, a former venture investor and founder of Lowercase Capital. They have three daughters together.
