= Simon Willison =

Computer programmer (born 1981)

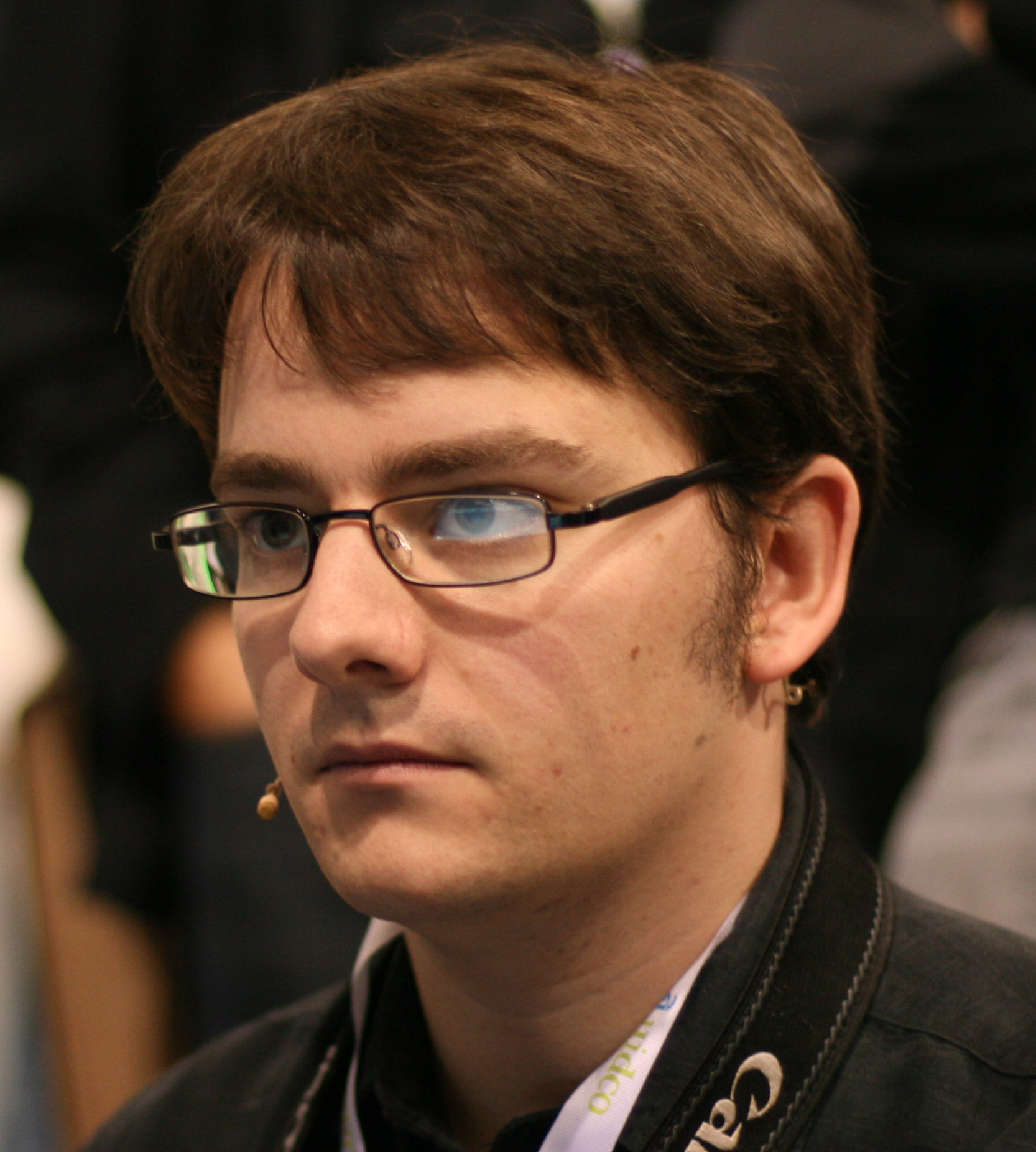
- Willison in 2008
- Born: January 1981 (age 45); United Kingdom
- Education: University of Bath (B.Sc. Computer Science, 2005)
- Occupations: web developer, entrepreneur
- Known for: Django Web framework, Lanyrd
- Website: simonwillison.net

Simon Willison (born January 1981) is a British programmer, co-founder of the social conference directory Lanyrd, and co-creator of the Django Web framework.

== Career ==
In 2003–2004, he and other web developers (Adrian Holovaty, Jacob Kaplan-Moss and Wilson Miner) created Django, an open source web application framework for Python.

After graduating in 2005, Willison worked on Yahoo's Technology Development team and on very early versions of the Fire Eagle Internet geolocation service. After Yahoo! he worked as a consultant on OpenID and web development in various publishing and media companies. Willison was hired in 2008 by the UK newspaper The Guardian to work as a software architect.

In late 2010, he launched the social conference directory Lanyrd with his wife and co-founder, Natalie Downe. They received funding from Y Combinator in early 2011. In 2013, Lanyrd was acquired by Eventbrite with Simon and Natalie joining the Eventbrite engineering team in San Francisco.

Willison has been a board member of the Python Software Foundation since 2022. As of 2025, he intends to continue serving for another three-year term.

In June 2025, Willison coined the term "lethal trifecta" to describe AI agents that combine three risky capabilities: access to private data, exposure to untrusted content, and the ability to communicate externally.

In February 2026, following the discontinuation of The World Factbook by the CIA, Willison managed to retrieve and download the last ZIP file archive of the website, released in 2020, before extracting it into a freely accessible GitHub repository.
