= Tech Herfrica =

Non-profit organization

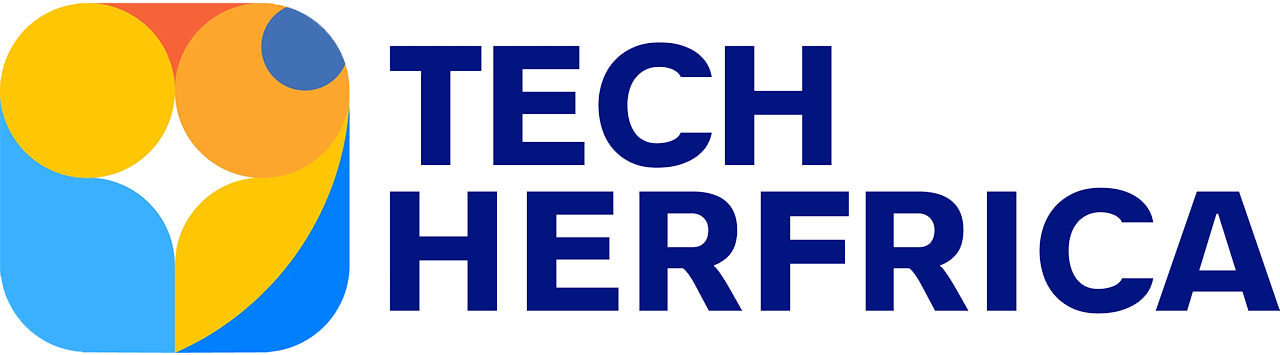
- Established: 2023
- Founder: Imade Bibowei-Osuobeni
- Type: NGO, Nonprofit
- Headquarters: Abuja, Nigeria
- Staff: 500+ (Staff and Volunteers)
- Website: techherfrica.org

Tech Herfrica is a non-governmental social impact organization that focuses on the digital and financial inclusion of women and girls in rural areas of Africa. The organization was established in February 2023 by Imade Bibowei-Osuobeni, a Nigerian public policy advisor and advocate for the inclusive digital economy. Bibowei-Osuobeni is also the founder and chief executive officer of Tech Herfrica.

Tech Herfrica’s assists women and girls in rural and marginalized communities in Africa to thrive in the digital economy. The organization supports the development of women-led businesses in these rural communities, using technology as a tool to bridge the digital divide.

== Programs and focus ==
Tech Herfrica's activities include providing farmers and traders, especially women, in rural Africa with the information, digital tools, digital and financial literacy training, and resources they need to enhance their farming and business activities to sell more of their products at competitive market prices. The organization works to reduce poverty, reduce food waste, contribute to food security, promote social orientation, and promote digital equity.

Tech Herfrica operates through different digital and financial literacy programmes that offers to its beneficiariesAccess to an e-commerce platform, "HerLocal Market", that connects rural female farmers and traders in Africa to local and international buyers,Access to freely distributed internet-enabled mobile devices, health insurance, business finance, supply credit and long-term savings plans,Access to local technology for farmers and traders to increase production,Digital financial literacy training in indigenous languages for women and girls in rural African communities,Access to essential information on market prices, new markets, weather forecasts, improved agricultural methods, and governmental policies.

The organization has trained thousands of farmers and traders, impacted communities, distributed mobile devices, disbursed business finance, facilitated millions of Naira in trade, and increased the income of its beneficiaries by 50% on average.

== History ==
Tech Herfrica, founded in February 2023 by Imade Bibowei-Osuobeni, a Nigerian public policy advisor and advocate for the inclusive digital economy, is headquartered in Abuja, Nigeria. Tech Herfrica’s main focus is providing women and girls in rural African communities with digital tools, information, digital and financial literacy training, and other resources to enhance their livelihoods and opportunities.

The organization has expanded its scope to support the agricultural and entrepreneurial activities of these women and girls, helping them to increase their productivity and market access. Tech Herfrica relies entirely on voluntary assistance and contributions from corporate individuals, government, and private donors and currently operates in six African countries: Nigeria, Ghana, Kenya, Uganda, Rwanda, and Tanzania.

== Activity ==
Tech Herfrica, expanding its social impact beyond Nigeria, has engaged in projects across Africa to assist African women and girls in the fields of technology, digital and financial literacy, and entrepreneurship. In collaboration with Orbeets Digi-Tech Solution, Tech Herfrica partnered to build an e-commerce platform, "HerLocal Market" to connect local and international buyers to rural female sellers and women farmers in various underserved African communities in March 2023.

To provide digital literacy training, Tech Herfrica, in collaboration with Faslearn Africa and the African Leadership Foundation, built, organized, and managed the “Digital Literacy for All” course, made available to pupils in public schools in underserved communities across Africa in March 2023.

It conducts digital and financial literacy training in local languages In Nigeria, Tech Herfrica has digitalized its courses in Hausa, Igbo, Yoruba, and Pidgin English, which are pretty much installed on the beneficiaries internet enabled phones.

Conducting agricultural training and giving agricultural incentives in May 2023, the organization collaborated with Onome Foods and Lexicon media to promote food security and empower women farmers and traders in rural communities under the "EquipHer 4Growth" initiative.

In June 2023, Tech Herfrica and Afriex assisted some Nigerian women in agriculture by providing them with the necessary tools, such as free smartphones, point of sale (POS) devices, microfinance loans, and access to digital resources to improve their trade.

Giving financial aid and education, Tech Herfrica collaborated with Sterling Bank in September 2023 to offer the "One Woman Saver" designed with the needs of low-income earning rural Nigerian women in mind, offering incentives to women who cultivate a continuous savings habit cycle by giving back 6% interest on their savings and access to business loans.

Other entities that assisted the organization to deliver digital and financial literacy programmes in various underserved communities across Africa as of October 2023 include Champion Mall, Gention Global Resources, Visual Earth Group, the Fight Against Drug and Alcohol Foundation, Bridge Outpost Mega Services, Bullbear, and other volunteers in support of the organization's goals.

Tech Herfrica's activities align with the goals of the Sustainable Development Goals 1, 4, 5, and 8, which focus on ending poverty everywhere, provision of quality education, ensuring Gender Equality and provision of Decent work and economic growth.

== Awards and recognition ==
Tech Herfrica
Year	Award	Issued by	Result	Ref
2023	2023 Sustainable Development Goals (SDG) Digital Game Changers Award in the People Category	International Telecommunication Union (ITU)	Won	
2023	Visionary African Women Award	Lilian Ike Foundation	Won	
2023	Women Empowerment Champion	Corporate Social Responsibility (CSR) Reporters	Won	
