= Mux (company) =

American technology company

Mux, Inc.
- Type: Privately held company
- Industry: Streaming media
- Founded: 2015
- Founder: Jonathan Dahl, Steve Heffernan, Matthew McClure, Adam Brown
- Headquarters: San Francisco, California
- Products: Mux Data, Mux Video
- Website: mux.com

Mux is a video technology company headquartered in San Francisco, California. Mux focuses on video streaming infrastructure software and video performance analytics.

== History ==
Mux was founded in 2015 by Jonathan Dahl, Steve Heffernan, Matthew McClure, and Adam Brown. Jonathan Dahl and Steve Heffernan are the founders of Zencoder, a cloud encoding company sold to Brightcove in 2012. The name “Mux” is short for “multiplexing,” a reference to combining multiple signals into one in digital media.

Mux has raised a total of $11.8m from Accel Partners, YCombinator, Lowercase Capital, Susa Ventures, SV Angel, and more. Mux is member of Heavybit and went through the YCombinator program in 2016.

Mux's first product was a quality of service (QoS) analytics platform to measure a viewer's experience while watching video. In 2018, Mux announced an API for video streaming using per-title encoding, a technique similar to that used by Netflix.
