= Meesho =

Online commerce platform based in India

Meesho Limited
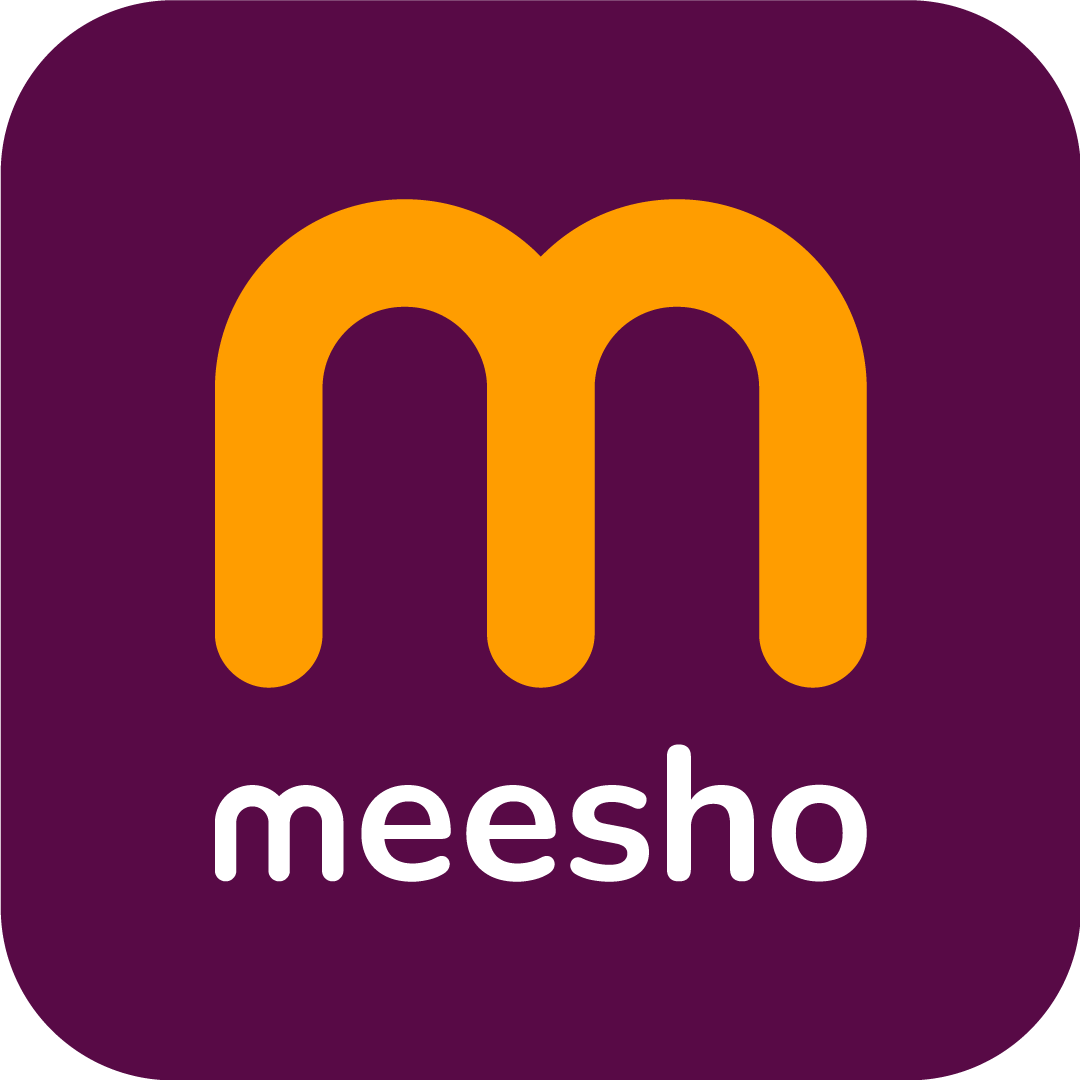
- Website type: Public
- Traded as: NSE: MEESHO; BSE: 544632
- Founded: December 2015; 10 years ago
- Headquarters: Bengaluru, Karnataka, India
- Area served: India
- Owner: Meesho Private Limited
- Founders: Vidit Aatrey; Sanjeev Barnwal
- Key people: Vidit Aatrey (CEO); Sanjeev Barnwal (CTO)
- Industry: E-commerce
- Services: Online shopping
- Revenue: ▲₹13,099 crore (US$1.4 billion) (FY26)
- Net income: ▲₹−1,358 crore (US$−140 million) (FY26)
- Website: meesho.com
- Users: 190 million

Meesho Limited (short for Meri shop, transl. My shop) is an Indian e-commerce company, headquartered in Bengaluru. Founded by Vidit Aatrey and Sanjeev Barnwal in December 2015, Meesho is an online marketplace in categories such as fashion, home and kitchen, beauty and personal care, electronics accessories, and daily use products.

== History ==
Meesho Private Limited, formerly Fashnear Technologies Private Limited, was established by IIT Delhi graduates Vidit Aatrey and Sanjeev Barnwal in December, 2015 In 2016, the founders came up with the idea of re-establishing the platform as Meesho, one that would enable country-wide shipping for resellers with the use of social media sites as tools for marketing.

In February 2019, the platform reported having around 209,000 users and about 1.2 million monthly orders, and in March 2020, it reported approximately 563,000 users and 3.1 million monthly orders. In 2021, the Meesho mobile application was ranked among the most downloaded shopping apps globally. In 2022, Meesho had about 120 million monthly users and about 910 million orders were made through the platform, with a gross merchandise value (GMV) of about $5 billion.

According to report as of August 2023 Meesho delisted 42 lakh counterfeit listings and 10 lakh restricted products under its initiative Project Suraksha. During the same period, the platform blocked access for over 12,000 user accounts flagged for policy violations. The Court granted injunctive relief by directing domain registrars to suspend the infringing websites. Additionally, the Court ordered law enforcement authorities to initiate criminal investigations, freeze associated financial accounts against the identified offenders.

In 2023, Meesho became the fastest shopping app to cross over 500 million downloads.

In 2024, Meesho introduced Valmo, a logistics marketplace, to provide shipment services to sellers by aggregating multiple logistics providers. Meesho employs over 3,000 small businesses and 10-12 large firms for warehousing and sorting operations within its logistics framework. According to media reports, Valmo operating in approximately 15,000 pincodes in India with around 6,000 partners. It is reported to handle over 50% of Meesho's daily orders.

In November 2024, Meesho introduced a generative AI-powered voice bot for customer support, managing approximately 60,000 calls daily in English and Hindi. According to media reports, the system resolves the majority of queries without human assistance, with only a small fraction of calls requiring manual intervention.

According to media reports, in 2024, Meesho prevented over 22 million suspicious or potentially fraudulent transactions on its platform. The company initiated legal proceedings, resulting in the filing of twelve cases, including nine specifically targeting over forty individuals in the cities of Kolkata and Ranchi. The company filed a suit in the Delhi High Court for a permanent injunction against parties operating deceptive websites misappropriating its brand identity.

Meesho went public through an initial public offering in December 2025, raising $603 million. It is listed on both the BSE and NSE.

== Recognition ==
In 2023, Meesho was named one of the most influential companies of the year by Time (magazine).

== See also ==
- List of Y Combinator startups
- Social commerce
