= Lowercase Capital =

American venture capital firm

- Industry: Venture capital
- Founded: 2010; 16 years ago
- Founder: Chris Sacca
- Headquarters: San Francisco, California, United States
- Key people: Crystal English Sacca, Clay Dumas, Rebecca Revel
- Website: lowercasecapital.com

Lowercase Capital was an American venture capital firm that provided seed and early-stage funding for several successful startups, including Twitter, Twilio, Kickstarter, Uber, Instagram, and Stripe. It raised over $1 billion in capital, and sources claim a return of at least $5 billion to its investors. In 2017 Chris Sacca closed the fund for new start-up investments to focus on climate action and politics. He said, however, that Lowercase Capital would continue to support the existing portfolio of investments.

== History ==
Lowercase was founded by Chris Sacca in May 2010 with commitments of $8.5 million from limited partners including Richard Branson and Eric Schmidt. One of the firm's marquee investments was an investment in pre-IPO Twitter, which contributed to more than 1,500% growth in Lowercase's funds, returning approximately “$5 billion to investors.” Fortune has speculated that Lowercase Ventures Fund I, with holdings in Uber, Docker, and Optimizely is the best-performing fund of all time from a return multiple perspectives.

Founder Chris Sacca refers to himself as the “proprietor” of Lowercase. In the context of his work at Lowercase, Forbes has credited him with allegedly crafting “the best seed portfolio ever. In 2017, the performance of the various funds earned Sacca second place on the Forbes’ Midas List, a yearly ranking of tech investors. He served as a sometimes “shark” on the TV show “Shark Tank” and played himself in ABC's “Alex Inc.”

Crystal English Sacca, Chris's spouse and a former advertising creative, is a partner at the firm. She co-led many investments, including in Uber, Blue Bottle, and Veggie Grill. Before the firm she won a Cannes Lion, Two Gold Cannes Cyberlions and other awards in the advertising industry.

In 2013, Matt Mazzeo joined Lowercase Capital as a partner. Mazzeo had worked at Creative Artists Agency, an entertainment and sports agency. In 2015, Mazzeo led a $25mm fund raised by Lowercase.

In April 2017, Chris Sacca announced that the firm would cease to raise further capital from new investors or invest in new companies, but would continue to support its existing portfolio.

== Investments ==
Lowercase provides capital and advisory services to seed-stage startups and growth-stage companies. Among the companies Lowercase has invested in that have gone public or been acquired are Twitter, Instagram, Twilio, Facebook, and Uber. Well-known private companies in the Lowercase portfolio include Stripe, Docker, Optimizely, Kickstarter, WordPress, Medium, and Lookout. After 2017, Lowercase investments include Tala, Toymail, Lumi, Joymode, Nurx, Mark43, Makespace, Gimlet Media, Hatch Baby, and Wizeline.

Lowercase was active in 2017 in demanding the resignation of former Uber CEO Travis Kalanick following accusations of misconduct within Uber.

Its investments also included 9GAG, Automattic, Chartbeat, Dubsmash, Flirtey, Lumi, Noun Project, Optimizely, Poll Everywhere, Ranker, Slack, Streak, Stripe, Uber, Urban Airship, Veggie Grill, and Webshots.
