= Corgi (insurance company) =

American insurance carrier

- Type: Private
- Industry: Insurance technology
- Founded: 2024; 2 years ago, in San Francisco, California, U.S.
- Founders: Nico Laqua; Emily Yuan
- Headquarters: San Francisco, California, U.S.
- Area served: United States
- Key people: Nico Laqua (CEO); Emily Yuan (COO)
- Website: corgi.com

Corgi is an American insurance technology company based in San Francisco that operates as a licensed insurance carrier for technology startups. The company was founded in 2024 and received regulatory approval to operate as an admitted insurance carrier in 2025. Its product line includes directors and officers liability, cyber insurance, commercial general liability, and AI liability coverage. As of June 2026, the company was valued at $2.6 billion following a Series B1 financing round.

Corgi has drawn media attention for its intense workplace culture, including employees who work six or seven days a week in the company's office.

== History ==
Corgi was founded in 2024 by Nico Laqua and Emily Yuan. The company participated in Y Combinator's Summer 2024 batch. Laqua serves as chief executive officer and chief technology officer, and Yuan serves as chief operating officer.

In July 2025, Corgi received regulatory approval to operate as a licensed insurance carrier. In January 2026, the company announced it had raised a total of US$108 million in seed and Series A financing at a $630 million valuation, with investors including Y Combinator, Contrary, SV Angel, and Alumni Ventures.

In January 2026, Corgi emerged from stealth and announced $108 million in combined seed and Series A funding, co-led by Y Combinator and Kindred Ventures, with participation from Contrary, Glade Brook Capital Partners, and other investors.

In early 2026, Corgi launched an exchange traded funds issuer and asset manager known as Corgi Invest.

In May 2026, Corgi raised $160 million in a Series B round led by TCV. In June 2026, the company raised a $106 million Series B1, also led by TCV, valuing the company at $2.6 billion.

In June 2026, Papermark co-founder Mark Seitz accused Corgi of plagiarism and copyright infringement over its competing Dataroom product. Corgi denied copying source code but acknowledged similarities in language and design, which CEO Nico Laqua attributed to vibe coding. Corgi subsequently sent Seitz a cease-and-desist letter demanding he retract the allegations.

== Locations and facilities ==
A Corgi cafe on its opening day

Corgi is headquartered in San Francisco and has offices in Salt Lake City, Atlanta, Chicago, Dallas, New York, and London. In February 2026, the company opened a 24-hour café called Corgi cafe on the ground floor of its San Francisco headquarters, offering a discount to Y Combinator alumni; as of April 2026, the café was reported to be operating at a loss. In April 2026, Corgi launched free bus routes in San Francisco serving the area around Y Combinator's offices.

== Corporate culture ==
The work culture inside Corgi is described as "intense", with many employees spending six or seven days a week in office. A large number of employees got tattoos of the company's logo, and were gifted a mattress to use to sleep in the company's office rather than returning home. Richard Nieva, writing in Forbes, described the company's office as "occup[ying] the thin line between tech startup and lived-in frat house".

== See also ==
- List of Y Combinator startups
