= Zerocater =

San Francisco catering company

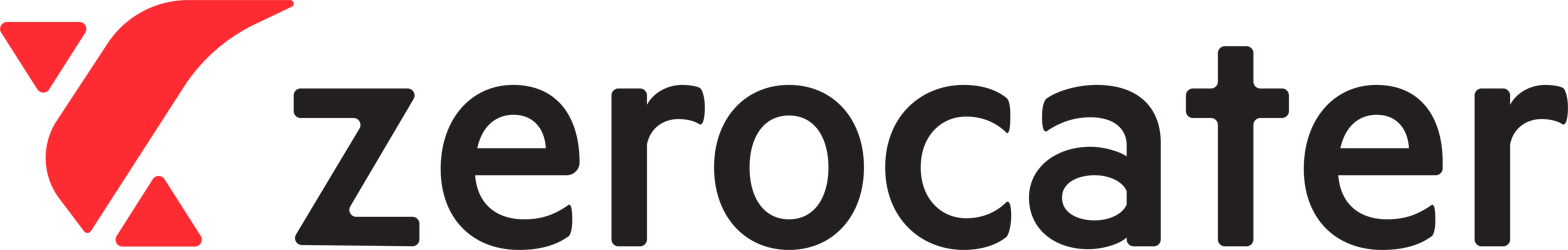
- Type: Private
- Industry: Catering, foodservice
- Founded: 2009
- Founders: Arram Sabeti
- Headquarters: 115 Stillman Street; San Francisco, California 94107, United States
- Area served: United States
- Key people: Ali Sabeti (CEO)
- Website: zerocater.com

Zerocater is a food service company headquartered in San Francisco, California, specializing in providing companies with catered meals from local restaurants, caterers, and food trucks. The company expanded its offerings in 2017 to include a fully customizable solution for office snacking called ZeroCater Snacks and Kitchens and, in 2018, to deliver alcohol with Zerocater Pours. The company launched Enterprise Catering for companies with 500 or more employees in 2019. Zerocater currently feeds thousands of employees of companies including Slack, PagerDuty, Chan Zuckerberg Initiative, Salesforce, JUUL, Datadog, and Cisco Meraki. As of November 2017, ZeroCater operates in the San Francisco Bay Area, New York City, Los Angeles, Austin, Washington, D.C., and Chicago.

== History ==
Zerocater was founded in 2009 by Arram Sabeti. As an early employee at Justin. tv (now Twitch.tv) Arram was responsible for ordering lunch for their office. He created a process to make it easy to order from a variety of local restaurants. Soon other companies began asking for his list of restaurants. Sensing this might be a new business opportunity, Arram left Justin. tv to work full-time on what would become ZeroCater. After running the business on a spreadsheet and bootstrapping for 18 months Zerocater was accepted into the Winter 2011 class of Y Combinator and placed first on Demo Day.

In 2011, ZeroCater raised a $1.5m seed round from investors including Paul Buchheit (the creator of Gmail and Google’s unofficial ‘Don’t be evil’ motto), SV Angel, and Vaizra. In 2016, Zerocater raised a $4.1m Series A. In 2018, ZeroCater raised $12m Series B led by Cleveland Avenue, founded by the former CEO of McDonald's, with participation by Justin Kan, Romulus Capital, and Struck Capital.

In 2020, Zerocater laid off the majority of its workforce due to the COVID-19 global pandemic.

As companies return to office in a hybrid workforce model, Zerocater now provides two basic varieties of service: a “Cloud Cafe” that lets individuals pre-order boxed meals from a daily selection; and a “Managed Cafe” that provides buffet-style offerings with the offerings and amounts also pre-determined by pre-ordering. Alongside those, it lets companies blend those two together, and it also provides its services for one-off events. Food experiences are delivered, designed, and staffed by Zerocater people.

In 2023, Zerocater raised $15m Series C led by Cleveland Avenue, with participation by Romulus Capital.

== Media coverage ==
Zerocater has been covered in Fast Company, the Wall Street Journal, Business Insider, Forbes, and CNNMoney.

== See also ==
- online food ordering
- Waiter.com
