= Nous Research =

American artificial intelligence company

- Type: Private
- Industry: Artificial intelligence
- Founded: 2022 (as a volunteer collective); 2023 (as a company)
- Founders: Jeffrey Quesnelle; Karan Malhotra; Ryan Teknium; Shivani Mitra
- Key people: Dillon Rolnick (CEO)
- Products: Hermes language models; Hermes Agent; DisTrO; Psyche
- Website: nousresearch.com

Nous Research is an American artificial intelligence company that develops open-source large language models, AI agent software and methods for training models over the public internet. It began in 2022 as a group of volunteers and was established as a company in 2023. Its work includes the Hermes series of language models, the DisTrO training optimizer, the Psyche training network, which is built on the Solana blockchain, and Hermes Agent, an open-source agent released in February 2026.

The company raised a US$50 million Series A round led by the cryptocurrency investment firm Paradigm in April 2025, and a $90 million round in October 2026 at a reported valuation of $1.5 billion.

== History ==
=== Origins ===
According to Fortune, Nous was founded in 2022 by a group of volunteers who met on Discord, GitHub and Twitter, and worked as an open-source research organization made up mostly of AI researchers. Other reports date the company to 2023 and name its founders as Jeffrey Quesnelle, Karan Malhotra, Ryan Teknium and Shivani Mitra. VentureBeat has also described the researcher Bowen Peng as a co-founder.

The group's early work consisted of fine-tuning existing open models, including Meta's Llama and models from Mistral AI, which it released under the name Hermes. It also published YaRN, a method for extending the context window of open models. In 2024 VentureBeat described Nous as a small research team whose stated aim was to make "personalized, unrestricted AI" models.

=== 2024–2025 ===
Nous closed a $5.2 million seed round in January 2024, led by Distributed Global and OSS Capital. In August 2024 it released the Hermes 3 models and published DisTrO, an optimizer intended to let models be trained across ordinary internet connections. In November 2024 it launched Nous Chat, its first chatbot aimed at end users, and in December 2024 it began pre-training a 15-billion-parameter language model on hardware spread across the United States and Europe, publishing the progress of the run online.

In April 2025 the company raised a $50 million Series A round, financed almost entirely by Paradigm, and announced a test network for Psyche, its distributed training system. At the time the company had about 20 staff, and The Block identified Quesnelle as chief executive, Malhotra as head of behavior and Teknium as head of post-training. The Hermes 4 models followed in August 2025.

=== 2026 ===
Nous released Hermes Agent in February 2026, a few weeks after the open-source agent OpenClaw had drawn wide attention, and followed it in June with a desktop application. By July 2026 the agent's GitHub repository had about 214,000 stars, and TechCrunch reported that the company was finalizing a round of at least $75 million led by Robot Ventures.

On October 7, 2026, Nous announced that it had raised $90 million from investors including Nvidia, Microsoft's M12, Samsung, Robot Ventures, Union Square Ventures, Y Combinator and Menlo Ventures. It said the money would fund Hermes for Businesses, a commercial version of its agent. The Wall Street Journal reported the valuation as $1.5 billion; the company did not disclose one. Dillon Rolnick was the company's chief executive at the time of the announcement.

== Products and research ==
=== Hermes language models ===
Hermes is a series of open-weight language models made by fine-tuning models from other developers. Hermes 3, released in August 2024, was built on Meta's Llama 3.1 in versions with 8, 70 and 405 billion parameters. Nous said the models were designed to follow a user's instructions and system prompt closely, in contrast to commercial models that may decline requests.

Hermes 4, released in August 2025, added what the company calls hybrid reasoning: users can choose between a quick answer and a slower mode in which the model writes out intermediate steps before responding. Its largest version has 405 billion parameters, and the weights are available for download on Hugging Face. Alongside the models, Nous introduced RefusalBench, its own benchmark of how often models refuse requests, on which it reported that Hermes 4 refused less often than models from OpenAI and Anthropic.

Nous Chat, launched in November 2024, is a web chatbot that initially ran the 70-billion-parameter version of Hermes 3.

=== Distributed training ===
DisTrO (Distributed Training Over-the-Internet), published in August 2024, is an optimizer that reduces the amount of data that graphics processing units must exchange at each step of training. In a test reported in the company's paper, which used 32 Nvidia H100 processors and a 1.2-billion-parameter model, the data sent per step fell from 74.4 gigabytes to 86.8 megabytes, a reduction of about 857 times, with a slight loss in performance. DisTrO builds on an earlier algorithm, DeMo (decoupled momentum optimization), developed with Diederik P. Kingma, a co-inventor of the Adam optimizer.

Psyche is a network that uses DisTrO to coordinate training across machines in different locations. It uses the Solana blockchain to coordinate participants, who contribute idle computing capacity and can be rewarded with cryptocurrency. When the Series A round was announced, the company had not decided whether rewards would be paid in a token of its own or in Solana's.

=== Hermes Agent ===
Hermes Agent is an open-source autonomous agent released in February 2026 under the MIT License. It runs on a user's own computer or server, works with language models from many providers, and saves methods that worked as reusable skills. Nous sells access to language models through a service called Nous Portal and offers a hosted version of the agent on paid plans. The company said in October 2026 that the software had been cloned more than 24 million times.

== Funding ==
Funding rounds
Date	Round	Amount	Investors	Notes
January 2024	Seed	$5.2 million	Led by Distributed Global and OSS Capital	
2024	Additional seed funding	About $15 million	Delphi Ventures, North Island Ventures and others	Included a round in June 2024 that was not announced at the time
April 2025	Series A	$50 million	Financed almost entirely by Paradigm	Reported to value the company's planned token at $1 billion
October 2026	Series B	$90 million	Nvidia, M12, Samsung, Robot Ventures, Union Square Ventures, Y Combinator, Menlo Ventures and others	Valuation reported as $1.5 billion

The $1 billion figure reported in 2025 was a valuation of a cryptocurrency token that the company had not yet issued, rather than of its equity. Fortune attributed it to an unnamed person familiar with the deal, and The Block to an existing investor in the company.

== Reception ==
Coverage of the company's link to cryptocurrency has noted skepticism. Fortune wrote in 2025 that the AI research community had been broadly wary of crypto projects, and quoted Malhotra as acknowledging "a lot of room for grift" in the field. The magazine also reported that it was unclear whether the company's distributed approach could prevent poisoning of training data while matching the efficiency of training in a single data center. VentureBeat noted that the DisTrO results were preliminary, came from a small model, and left open whether the savings would hold as models grew.

The company's position against content restrictions has also drawn comment. When Nous Chat launched, a VentureBeat reporter found that the chatbot initially declined to explain how to make methamphetamine but produced something close to full instructions when the request was framed as a scene in a novel. Nous said the model was unmodified and that its warnings came from the system prompt. Reporting on Hermes 4, VentureBeat wrote that the models' minimal guardrails placed the release in the middle of debates over AI safety, and that they could in theory be used for harmful purposes.

Security researchers have examined Hermes Agent, which can run commands on the machine where it is installed. A May 2026 research note from the Cloud Security Alliance described an independent audit that reported four critical and nine high-severity findings in the agent's default configuration.

== See also ==
- Hermes Agent
- Open-source artificial intelligence
- Federated learning
