= Rohan Pavuluri =

Biography of Rohan Pavuluri, founder of Upsolve and CBO at Speechify

Rohan Pavuluri is an American entrepreneur. He is the co-founder and former CEO of Upsolve, a nonprofit organization that helps low-income Americans file for bankruptcy, and the Chief Business Officer at Speechify.

== Early life and education ==
Raised in the North Side of Chicago, Illinois, Pavuluri attended Phillips Exeter Academy for high school. He graduated from Harvard University in 2018 with a bachelor's degree in statistics.

== Career ==
=== Upsolve ===
As an undergraduate art Harvard, Pavuluri conducted research in the Harvard Law School Access to Justice Lab, working on self-help packets for people to file for bankruptcy on their own. During his sophomore year, Pavuluri explored the concept of an online web application that could help low-income families through the bankruptcy process for free. His pitch for this idea received a $10,000 prize from the i3 Innovation Challenge and additional grants from the Harvard Institute of Politics and Harvard Center for Public Interest.

Pavuluri later moved to Brooklyn, where the Robin Hood Foundation had offered him a free desk and mentorship. He conducted research at the Bankruptcy Court for the Eastern District of New York, where he met bankruptcy attorney Jonathan Petts. In 2016, Pavuluri co-founded Upsolve with Petts.

For his work on Upsolve, Pavuluri was included in the TIME100 Next 2021 List in the Innovators category. In 2022, Pavuluri received the Alli Gerkman Legal Visionary Award from the University of Denver's Institute for the Advancement of the American Legal System (IAALS), which recognizes early-career leaders working to reform the legal system.

Other Work

Pavuluri was the Board Director at the National Access to Justice Center at Fordham Law School and was a member of the Civil Justice for All Project of the American Academy of Arts and Sciences. He is a TED Fellow.

In 2022, Pavuluri joined Speechify, where he is the Chief Business Officer. He also is the volunteer board chair of Upsolve.
