= Ranker =

Website featuring poll lists

Ranker.com
- Website type: Infotainment
- Available in: English
- Headquarters: Los Angeles, California
- Owner: Ranker Inc.
- Founder: Clark Benson
- Industry: Digital media
- Revenue: $22 million (2017)
- Employees: 110
- Website: www.ranker.com
- Commercial: Yes
- Launched: August 2009; 17 years ago
- Current status: Active

Ranker.com is a website that features polls on entertainment, brands, sports, food, and culture. Ranker claims to be one of the largest databases of opinions, with more than 1 billion votes gathered on over millions of subjective voters. Ranker has hundreds of thousands of lists of opinions.

These lists have been referenced as a source for many pop-culture, trade, and tech publications, including TV and radio. Ranker collects individual user votes and tracks them across various lists, which purports to show correlations between interests across pop culture.

== History ==
Launched in August 2009, the site was founded by Clark Benson, who created Ranker as an alternative to user reviews available on ecommerce sites. Ranker offers crowdsourced polls and lists across a variety of topics, including rankings of food, drinks, and celebrities. "Ranker Insights" offers people voting correlation data for free, using psychographic correlation data to deliver personalized consumer recommendations ("if you like X, you'll also like Y, Z"), and also audience insights to marketers, studios, and platforms seeking a deeper understanding of consumer tastes and preferences.

Ranker's board members include Draper Associates investor Joel Yarmon. Investors include Draper Associates, Rincon Venture Partners, Lowercase Capital, Wavemaker, BullPen Capital and various angels, like Factual founder Gil Elbaz and Ryan Steelberg.

== Ranker Acquires Listverse ==
Listverse is a "top ten" website that provides 10-item lists on a variety of topics related to the bizarre, entertainment, general knowledge, lifestyle, science, society, and more. Jamie Frater started the website in 2009. Ranker acquired Listverse on April 5, 2022.
