= Kamcord =

- Website type: Mobile content community
- Owner: Lyft
- Creators: Matt Zitzmann, Aditya Rathnam, Kevin Wang
- Website: kamcord.com
- Commercial: Yes
- Registration: Optional
- Launched: June 13, 2012
- Current status: Inactive

Kamcord was a social media platform where users post and interact through video content from their mobile devices. Kamcord has pioneered a new content format called "shots," short videos or stills of a user's phone screen annotated with facecam, voice commentary, text, highlighting/drawing, animations, and other tools.

== History ==
Kamcord began as a Y-Combinator backed startup in the summer of 2012. It was founded by Aditya Rathnam, Kevin Wang, and CEO Matt Zitzmann. Their primary investors include GungHo, Tencent, and Translink Capital. The company is based in San Francisco, with additional offices in Tokyo and Seoul. Its initial launch in 2012 consisted of SDKs which mobile games could integrate to allow players to record and share their gameplay to Kamcord as well as popular content sharing networks like YouTube, Twitter, and Facebook. In Spring 2014 Kamcord launch the first versions of its dedicated iOS app, followed by an Android counterpart in June 2015.

=== SDK ===
Kamcord's initial product was an embeddable SDK for iOS which allowed users to record game clips and highlights. Once recorded, the user could upload the clip to Kamcord's platform which incorporated social features like profiles, comments, and sharing.

At its height, nearly 500 games utilized Kamcord's SDK including True Skate, My Talking Tom, and Goat Simulator. In 2014 they expanded their SDK into Android and exceeded 25 million clips shared from over 1 million gamers.

=== Transition to Live Streaming ===
On July 23, 2015 Kamcord launched a live streaming service along with a partner program for mobile game streamers. The company redesigned their iOS app, Android app, and website to prominently feature mobile game live streaming content. On Dec. 17th 2015 Kamcord released a mobile game broadcasting feature for their Android app. This enables direct-from-device streaming for Android 5.0 users, without the use of a computer to mirror the device.

=== Shots ===
In late September, Kamcord announced they would be discontinuing live streaming service to focus solely on the recently introduced shots feature. On October 10, 2016 Kamcord shut down their live streaming service and within a few months had transitioned fully into a social network for short form mobile screen content.

In November 2017, Kamcord was announced to shut down and the team joined Lyft.
