= Strikingly =

Website building platform

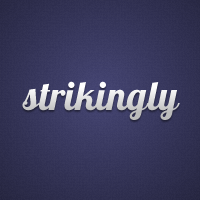
- Company type: Private
- Area served: Worldwide
- Founders: David Chen; Dafeng Guo; Teng Bao
- Industry: Website builder, web hosting service, blogging
- Website: www.strikingly.com

Strikingly is a Chinese, "mobile-first" website builder and blogging platform. Its aim is to allow a user with little or no development experience to create mobile optimized websites and blogs. In addition to smartphones and tablets, websites created with Strikingly are "enhanced for viewing across all devices", including desktops.

Strikingly is the first Chinese company to graduate from the Y Combinator seed accelerator.

== History ==
Chief executive officer (CEO) David Haisha Chen, chief technology officer (CTO) Dafeng Guo, and chief design officer (CDO) Teng Bao founded the company in 2012.

Strikingly released its beta platform in August 2012. In June 2013, Strikingly was selected for Y Combinator’s winter startup program in Mountain View. In April 2013, Strikingly raised a total of $1.5M in seed round from 16 investors, including Ron Conway, founder of SV Angel, and other prominent venture capital firms including Y Combinator, Index Ventures, Funders Club, Infinite Venture Partners, ZenShin Capital, and Innovations Works. In August 2017, the 5 year old startup announced it had raised $6M in a Series A round of investment from CAS Holding, Infinity Venture Partners, Innovation Works, Kevin Hale and TEEC.

== Product ==
Strikingly is a free online website builder and blogging platform. The website builder and blogging platform also includes built-in SEO features, social media plug-ins, page analytics, and form/email collecting functionalities. The product is aimed at both individuals and small businesses, and has mainly been used to showcase portfolios, digital resumes, events, startup projects, and to create personal branding websites. In early 2014, Strikingly also launched its one-click site builder with Facebook and LinkedIn, allowing users to build mobile optimized web pages quickly. The builder pulls information like profile pictures, location, contact information, and work experience from the social media page to create a mobile optimized website.

Other competitors in the website building industry include Webflow, Wix.com, Weebly, Squarespace, Metaconex, WordPress, Site.pro, Duda.
