= OwnLocal =

American digital advertising startup

- Type: Technology
- Industry: Advertising
- Founded: Austin, Texas, United States (2010)
- Founder: Lloyd Armbrust; Jason Novek
- Headquarters: Austin, Texas, United States
- Key people: Lloyd Armbrust (CEO); Landon Morales (CRO)
- Products: AdForge; Origami
- Website: ownlocal.com

OwnLocal is an Austin, Texas-based digital advertising startup founded in 2010.

== History ==
Lloyd Armbrust and Jason Novek founded Seeing Interactive in 2010. Backed by seed accelerator Y-Combinator, the company launched as a service for local newspaper, TV, and Radio stations. After its launch, the startup raised $1 million in seed funding from various investors, including Lerer Ventures, Baseline Ventures, and angel investors Joshua Schachter and Paul Buchheit. The company changed its name to OwnLocal in March 2011.

In October 2011, OwnLocal received an undisclosed amount from a funding round led by Automattic, the developer of WordPress. The incubator 500 Startups also participated in the funding. The round raised the company's total funding to $2 million.

OwnLocal was one of the first for-profit companies to receive funding from the Knight Enterprise Fund, a fund for media innovation. The company also received an equity investment in February 2013 from Digital First Ventures for an undisclosed amount.

== Acquisitions ==
In May 2014, OwnLocal acquired Whoosh Traffic. Whoosh Traffic was an Austin-based company that powered SEO reporting for large Fortune 500 companies and small businesses. Whoosh was backed by Techstars, 500 Startups, and several other major technology investors.

OwnLocal acquired Sidengo on March 10, 2015. Sidengo was an easy-to-use website builder for people with no design or technical skills. Sidengo was started in Monterrey, Mexico by Jorge González and Gabriel Garza. As of March 2015, OwnLocal had integrated the Sidengo technology into their platform and planned to distribute the technology to their media partners.

OwnLocal acquired Inbound Press in March 2016. Inbound Press was created in Orange County, California by Andrew McFadden. The company's flagship product, Smart Media Kit, is a proven process that generates new advertising leads for newspapers. OwnLocal had added Smart Media Kit to its product offerings as of June 2016.

In 2017, OwnLocal acquired Wanderful Media.
