= Cofactor Genomics =

American biotech company

- Company type: Private
- Industry: Biotechnology and Bioinformatics Services
- Founded: St. Louis, Missouri, U.S. (2008)
- Headquarters: San Francisco, California, U.S.
- Area served: Worldwide
- Key people: Jarret Glasscock (CEO), Jon Armstrong (CSO), David Messina (COO)
- Website: www.cofactorgenomics.com

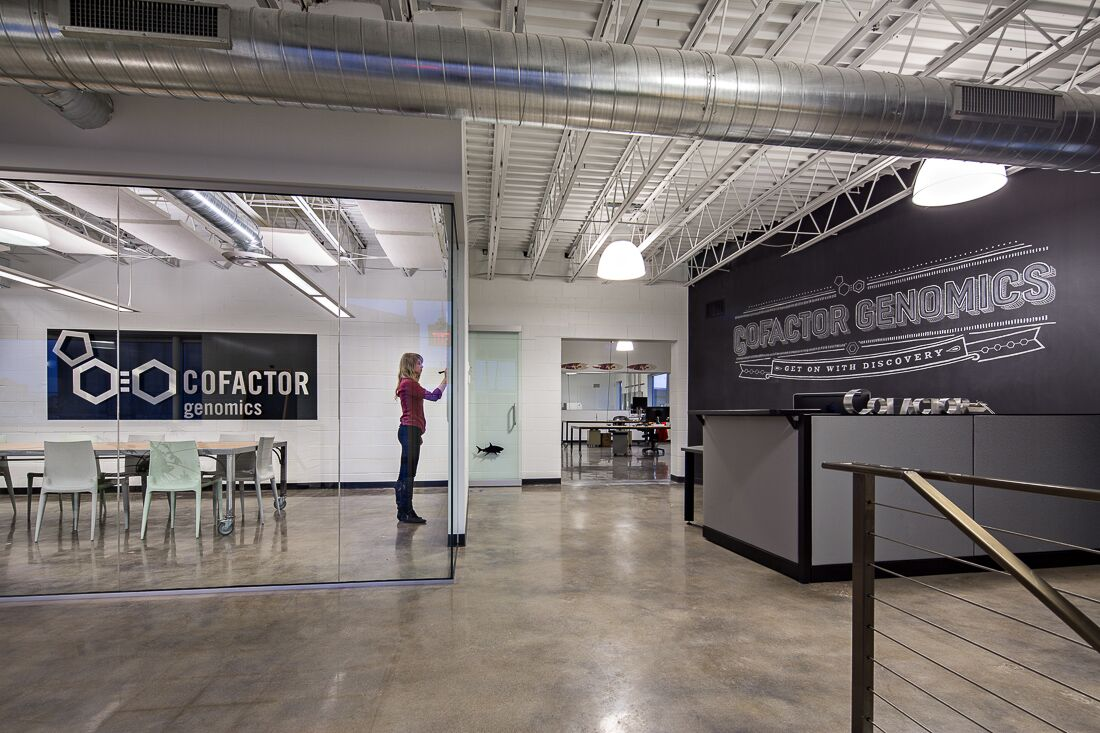

Cofactor Genomics is a biotech company that primarily focuses on drug development, medical research, and personalized medicine.

== Overview ==
Cofactor Genomics was founded in August 2008 by Jarret Glasscock, Matt Hickenbotham, and Ryan Richt. The technological advances brought on by Next Gen sequencing encouraged Glasscock, Hickenbotham and Richt to leave Washington University Genome Center and purchase their first Next Gen genome analyzer with capital raised from an angel investor in California.

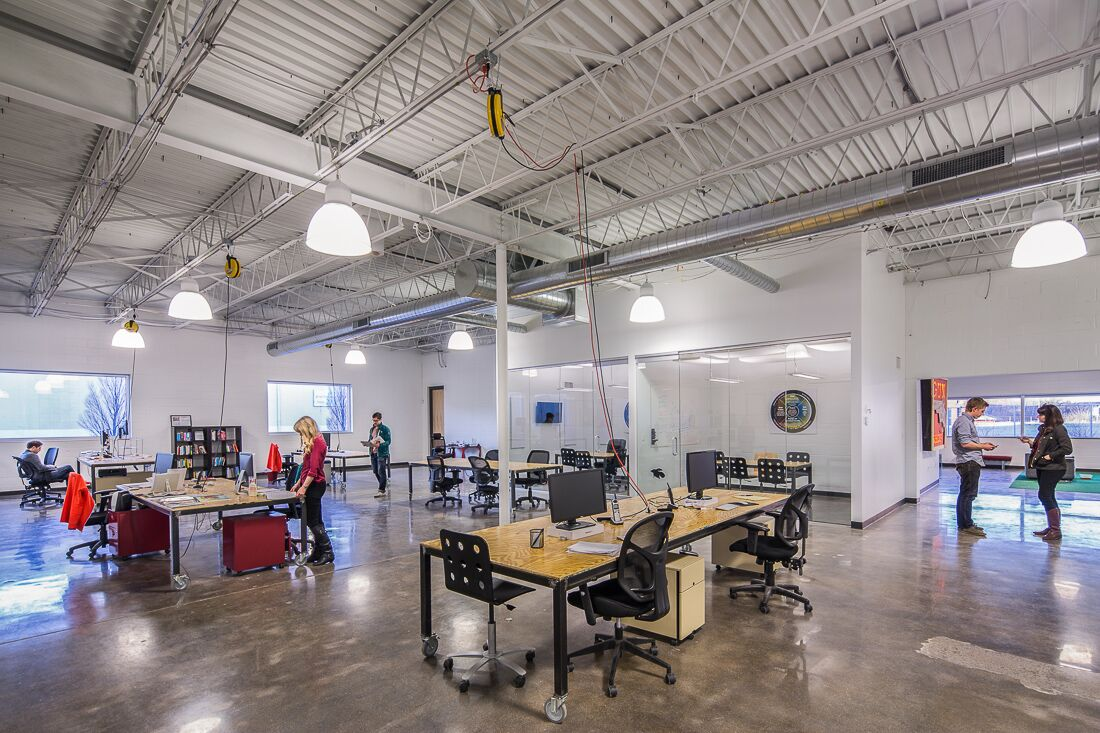

In November 2013, Cofactor Genomics opened a 10,000 ft^{2} headquarters in St. Louis, MO. The company also had offices in San Diego and San Francisco that later closed. In July 2015, Cofactor Genomics was awarded a $1.5 million Phase II Small Business Innovation Research (SBIR) grant by the National Institute on Drug Abuse (NIDA) at the National Institutes of Health (NIH). In addition to working with clients such as Ozzy Osbourne, Cofactor Genomics is involved in a number of research projects, including the preservation of the White Rhino and the Black Footed Ferret.

== Executive officers ==
Jarret Glasscock is a co-founder as well as the chief executive officer of Cofactor Genomics. Glasscock completed his undergraduate degree at the University of Arizona, where he majored in biology with a focus in the computer sciences. Upon graduation, Glasscock pursued his doctorate in genetics at Washington University in St. Louis, where he studied under Warren Gish, developer of the NCBI BLAST sequence analysis program.

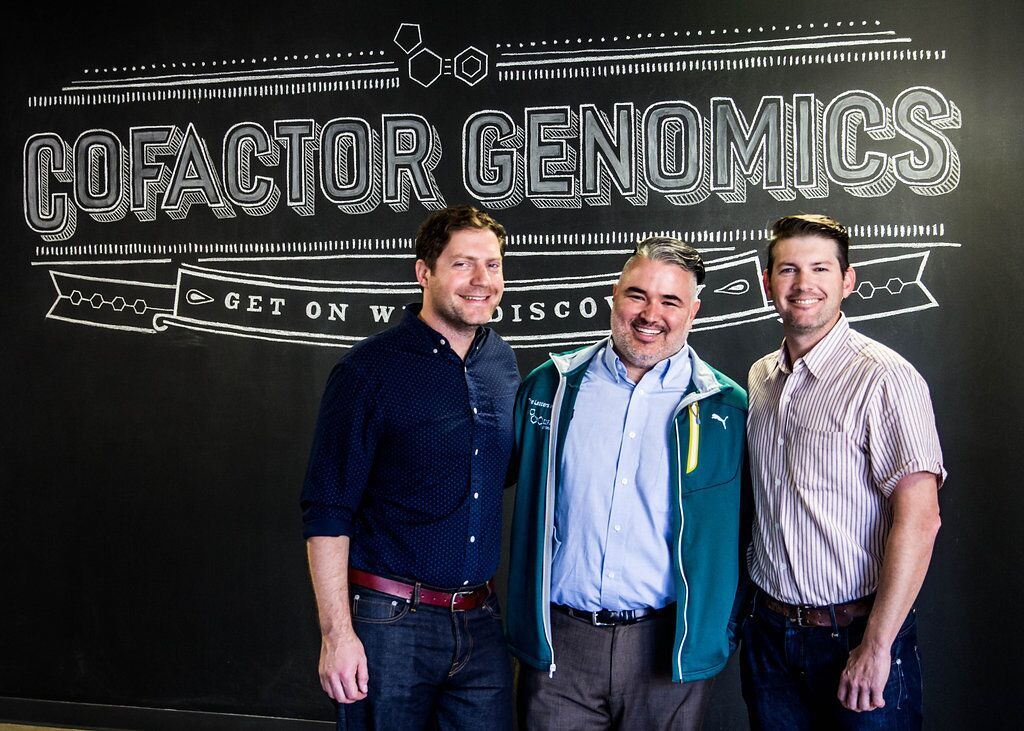

Jon Armstrong is the chief scientific officer of Cofactor Genomics. After acquiring his master's degree in neuroscience, Armstrong spent nine years in the Genome Center at Washington University's Technology Development Group.

David Messina is the chief operating officer of Cofactor Genomics. He has spent the last 19 years in computational biology and genetics. He worked on the Human Genome Project at Washington University in St. Louis, trained in molecular biology and human genetics at the University of Chicago, and earned his PhD in computational biology in Stockholm, Sweden.
