= Camacolaimidae =

Scientific classification
- Domain: Eukaryota
- Kingdom: Animalia
- Phylum: Nematoda
- Class: Chromadorea
- Order: Araeolaimida
- Family: Camacolaimidae; Micoletzky, 1924

Family of worms

Camacolaimidae is a family of nematodes belonging to the order Araeolaimida.

Genera:

- Listia Blome, 1982
- Loveninema Holovachov & Boström, 2012
- Neocamacolaimus Holovachov & Boström, 2014
- Notacamacolaimus Allgén, 1959
- Onchiolistia Blome, 2002
- Setostephanolaimus Tchesunov, 1994
- Smithsoninema Hope & Tchesunov, 1999
