= LendEDU =

- Founded: 2014
- Founders: Nate Matherson & Matt Lenhard
- Headquarters: Hoboken, New Jersey, U.S.A.
- Website: lendedu.com

LendEDU (pronounced Lend-E-D-U) is an online marketplace for a variety of financial products, including student loans, personal loans, and credit cards. It has been compared to Lendingtree.com, but for student lending. In 2018, LendEDU encountered controversy when it was revealed to be the undisclosed owner of "Student Loan Report", and its CEO was accused of "deceiving news organizations with a fake source".

== History ==
Nate Matherson and Matt Lenhard, University of Delaware students, attended the Iowa Startup Accelerator in summer 2014 with the idea for an online tutor-booking platform they called ShopTutors. The original idea was dismissed, and LendEDU, an online marketplace for student loans and student loan financing, became their focus; as someone with nearly $50,000 in student loan debt, Matherson was looking to refinance his student loans and realized the potential business idea that would eventually become LendEDU. Through the program, LendEDU earned $50,000 in funding from Built by Iowa. Additionally, LendEDU received a $5,000 grant from the University of Delaware's VentureOn program which focuses on the development of small businesses.

In 2015, the company raised a total of $120,000 in funding from the Horn Program Venture Development Center and Y Combinator.

LendEDU later moved its headquarters to Hoboken, New Jersey.

As of November 2020, LendEDU continues to operate out of Hoboken, New Jersey and the basic functionality of the site has remain largely unchanged since the company's inception. In addition to working in the student loan space, LendEDU now also has expanded to other financial verticals including mortgages, personal loans, credit cards, and insurance.

== Platform ==
The LendEDU platform provides information about student loans, mortgages, personal loans, and various insurance products.

The LendEDU platform enables consumers to compare lenders, rates, terms, and qualification requirements for financial products specific to the consumer's financial situation. For example, a borrower looking to refinance their student loans could compare lenders, rates, terms, and qualification requirements to find a student loan refinancing option that fits his or her specific situation.

LendEDU's site also features a number of calculators that the site maintains will help consumers "compare repayment options, payoff strategies, refinancing savings, tax deductions, and more."

== Charitable works & Initiatives ==
LendEDU's philanthropic efforts include work with One Tree Planted, a reforestation program that plants trees around the world in collaboration with partnering companies; the LendEDU Scholarship, which offers $1,000 scholarships to two students at the high school or college level two times per year; and donations to local charities in New Jersey like The Hoboken Shelter, Advance the Cure for MS, and the Community FoodBank of New Jersey.

In September 2019, LendEDU was a co-sponsor for the Pride Center of New Jersey's first annual gala that celebrated the Pride Center's 25th anniversary of service to New Jersey's LGBTQ community. Other sponsors of the event included Robert Wood Johnson University Hospital, WellCare, and KP Edgestone Realty.

== In the News ==
LendEDU's data and research have been featured in press reports.

In June 2019, LendEDU released another study that evaluated how seriously student loan debt weighs on consumers that are filing for Chapter 7 bankruptcy.

LendEDU's "top 50 college financial literacy program" rankings are based on a multitude of factors, including the number of workshops and resources available, access to one-on-one financial consultation, and incentivizing programs available.

In August 2020, LendEDU published its fifth annual "Student Loan Debt by School by State" report that revealed the average student loan debt per borrower figure in the United States had increased to $29,076 in 2019 compared to $28,565 in 2018.

In September 2020, LendEDU released a survey of 1,000 U.S. homeowners that found 55% of those who became homeowners amid the pandemic already regret the decision, mostly due to financial reasons.

=== Drew Cloud Controversy ===
Around 2016, a Web site called "The Student Loan Report" started conducting surveys and issuing reports. A 2018 report, quoted by outlets including Fox News, CNBC, and Inside Higher Ed, stated one in five had invested student loan money in digital currency. According to a subsequent investigation by the Chronicle of Higher Education, the Web site's ostensible founder, "Drew Cloud", despite having "corresponded at length with many journalists" to provide stories, turned out to be fictitious. The Chronicle accused LendEDU of "deceiving news organizations with a fake source" by using the pen name "Drew Cloud." The Chronicle also criticized that, despite LendEDU's ownership of the Student Loan Report, no association between the two had been disclosed. The Atlantic criticized that "The opaque process of managing student debt can be confusing, and LendEDU's strategy seized upon that confusion to encourage people to consider courses of action, including refinancing, that would make the company money."

The Boston Globe reported that "Pollfish, the company that performed the survey for Matherson, said it arrived at its results independently, and that the findings were accurate."

According to NPR, the Student Loan Report website received over 8,000 visitors in April 2018.

In March 2020, the Federal Trade Commission announced that it reached a settlement with operators of LendEDU over allegations of misleading ratings and reviews.
