= CrowdMed =

- Trade name: CrowdMed, Inc.
- Industry: Healthcare; Technology; Crowdsourcing
- Founders: Jared Heyman; Axel Setyanto; Jessica Greenwalt
- Headquarters: San Francisco, California
- Website: www.crowdmed.com

CrowdMed was a healthcare platform based in San Francisco, California. Jared Heyman, Axel Setyanto and Jessica Greenwalt founded the company in 2012. CrowdMed aims to diagnose rare medical conditions through crowdsourcing, and applying prediction market technology to medical data. As of May 2015, CrowdMed has solved over 900 cases.

Since October 16, 2023, the website appears down.

== History ==
Inspired by his sister's struggle to find a diagnosis for her FXPOI condition, Jared started CrowdMed.

CrowdMed was founded in 2012. During the creation process, the company's website was tested with 300 randomly selected people.

In 2013, CrowdMed launched its public beta at TEDMED in Washington, D.C.

CrowdMed has users in 21 countries around the world and has raised $2.4 million in seed funding from investors including New Enterprise Associates, Greylock Partners, Y Combinator, Andreessen Horowitz, Khosla Ventures and Patrick Dempsey.

As of September 2024, the CrowdMed LinkedIn page indicates the company has 10 employees.

== Operations ==
User information is kept anonymous, and their profile includes symptoms, health history, family background, and previous testing. Hundreds of "medical detectives" then submit possible diagnoses which other detectives elaborate on. These "medical detectives" can be anyone from medical school students, to retired physicians, to anyone else, as there is no requirement for a medical degree to use the app. The top three diagnoses are given to the patient for them to take to their doctor. The results from each medical detective are weighed based on their prior performance and current rating from patients, additionally medical detectives may also earn and share monetary rewards offered by patients to anyone who helps solve their case.

== Reception ==
Users have expressed concerns that the information provided may not always come from reliable sources. A study in January 2016, looked at almost 400 cases between May 2013 and April 2015. About half of patients were likely to recommend CrowdMed to a friend and about 60% reported that the experience provided insights that led them closer to the correct diagnoses.
