= Kickback (album) =

2001 compilation album by The Meters

Compilation album by The Meters
- Released: 2001
- Recorded: 1975–1976
- Genre: Funk
- Length: 56:56
- Label: Sundazed; B00005A0BF
- Producer: Allen Toussaint, Marshall Sehorn

The Meters chronology
Funkify Your Life: The Meters Anthology (1995)	Kickback (2001)	Fiyo at the Fillmore, Volume 1 (2003)

Professional ratings
Review scores
Source	Rating
AllMusic	3/5 stars
The Washington Post	Favorable

Kickback is a collection of rare and unreleased material by the funk group the Meters.

== Background ==
The fourteen tracks on this album were originally recorded in 1975 and 1976 for Fire on the Bayou and Trick Bag albums but were not released. The album includes original material as well as covers of songs by Earl King, The Beatles, Rolling Stones and Hank Williams. It includes a nine-minute cover of Neil Young's "Down by the River" as well as a cover of Booker T. & the M.G.'s instrumental hit "Hang 'Em High". The band had released another Neil Young cover on the Cabbage Alley album.

== Reception ==
Stephen Erlewine of AllMusic called the album a satisfying listen. He called the covers "intriguing" and said the band "lay[s] down a solid, irresistible groove" on the original songs. Music critic Geoffrey Himes wrote: "Kickback is no substitute for the original albums, but it offers some fascinating moments for the devoted New Orleans funk fan."

== Track listing ==
No.	Title	Writer(s)	Length
1.	"Big Chief"	Earl King	3:00
2.	"Come Together"	John Lennon, Paul McCartney	3:09
3.	"Hang 'Em High" (previously unissued version)	Dominic Frontiere, Ennio Morricone	3:29
4.	"What More Can I Do"	Leo Nocentelli	2:52
5.	"Keep on Marching (Funky Soldier)"	The Meters	3:23
6.	"Jambalaya"	Hank Williams	2:47
7.	"Down by the River" (previously unissued)	Neil Young	9:02
8.	"Honky Tonk Women" (previously unissued version)	Mick Jagger, Keith Richards	4:16
9.	"He Bite Me"	Ziggy Modeliste	2:58
10.	"Easy (Trip)"	George Porter Jr., Art Neville	5:58

2001 CD bonus tracks
No.	Title	Writer(s)	Length
11.	"Rock and Roll Medley: Rockin' Pneumonia / Something You Got / I Know / Everybody Loves a Lover"	Huey Smith, Chris Kenner, Barbara George, Robert Allen, Richard Adler	5:08
12.	"All I Do Everyday"	The Meters	4:59
13.	"Love the One You're With" (previously unissued)	Stephen Stills	3:34
14.	"A Mother's Love" (previously unissued)	Earl King	2:21

== Personnel ==
Credits adopted from Allmusic.

Primary artist

- George Porter Jr. – bass, background vocals, composer, producer
- Cyril Neville – congas, vocals, composer, producer
- Joseph Modeliste – drums, vocals, composer, producer
- Leo Nocentelli – guitar, background vocals, composer, producer
- Art Neville – keyboards, vocals, composer, producer

Production

- Allen Toussaint – producer
- Marshall E. Sehorn – producer
- Bill Dhalle – design, liner notes
- Bob Irwin – mastering
- Bunny Matthews – photography
- Jeff Smith – design
- Tim Livingston – project manager
- Efram Turchick – project manager
