= Verbling =

Online language learning platform

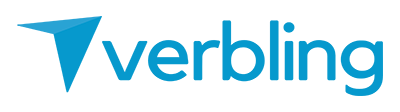
- Website type: Subsidiary
- Available in: Multilingual: Albanian; Arabic; Bengali; Bulgarian; Croatian; Czech; Danish; Dutch; English (American English); Finnish; French (European French); Gaelic; German; Greek; Hebrew; Hindi; Indonesian; Italian; Japanese; Korean; Latin; Latvian; Mandarin; Norwegian; Persian; Polish; Portuguese; Punjabi; Romanian; Russian; Serbian; Spanish; Swahili; Swedish; Thai; Turkish; Urdu; Vietnamese
- Headquarters: San Francisco, US
- Owner: Chegg
- Founder: Mikael Bernstein; Jake Jolis; Gustav Rydstedt
- Industry: Online education Translation
- Services: Language education
- Website: www.verbling.com
- Launched: July 8, 2011; 15 years ago
- Current status: Online

Verbling, a service of Chegg, is an online language learning platform that pairs individuals with language teachers via videotelephony. It also operates an enterprise version to aide employees in communicating with colleagues that speak other languages.

== History ==
Verbling was founded in 2011 by Jake Jolis, Mikael Bernstein, and Gustav Rydstedt, who met while attending Stanford University. The company's initial platform, Verbling Friends, connected users interested in learning each other's language to each other via videotelephony. Verbling was financed by Y Combinator in the summer of 2011.

It launched in July 2011.

In 2012, the company raised $1 million in funding and moved its headquarters from Palo Alto to San Francisco, California.

In November 2012, the company added nine new languages and Google Hangouts-powered chats.

In April 2013, it launched Verbling courses whereby students follow a set curriculum after taking a language assessment test.

In November 2013, it added private study groups.

In December 2013, Verbling launched Verbling Classes, a teaching platform, later discontinued in favor of private lessons. The classes were also live streamed so other users could watch the class without directly interacting with the lesson.

In 2015, Verbling raised $2.7 million in series A round funding to expand its technology to more platforms. Investors included Draper Fisher Jurvetson, SV Angel, Sam Altman, and Joshua Schachter.

In January 2016, the company offered free lessons in Swedish to Syrian refugees displaced by the Syrian Civil War.

In October 2016, it launched an enterprise version to aide employees in communicating with colleagues that speak other languages and signed Volkswagen Group and Zara as users.

In February 2017, Verbling launched Android and iOS mobile apps. The platform had 2000 teachers, offering classes in 43 languages, that year.

In January 2020, Verbling was acquired by Busuu for "double-digit millions". Busuu was acquired by Chegg in 2021.

== See also ==
- Community language learning
- Language education
- Online education
- Online platforms for collaborative consumption
