= 7 Cups =

Therapy and mental health service

- 7 Cups' official company logo (as of 2023)
- Former name: 7 Cups of Tea
- Website type: Online counseling
- Available in: 32 languages
- Founded: July 2013
- Founder: Glen Moriarty
- Website: www.7cups.com
- Commercial: Yes

7 Cups (formerly 7 Cups of Tea) is an online mental health platform. It provides peer-support chats through volunteer listeners trained in active listening, as well as paid online therapy services. The platform also includes community forums, group chat rooms, self-help resources, and separate areas for adult and teen users.

== History ==
In July 2013, 7 Cups of Tea (as it was known then) was founded by psychologist Glen Moriarty as a Y Combinator startup. The company later rebranded itself as simply 7 Cups.

The company derives its name from the eponymous poem by the 9th-century Chinese poet Lu Tong.

== Overview ==
7 Cups provides peer support through anonymous one-to-one chats with volunteer listeners trained in active listening. Users may also participate in community forums, group chat rooms, and self-help resources. The platform has separate areas for adult and teen users.

Volunteer listeners provide emotional support rather than clinical treatment and are not licensed therapists or counselors. 7 Cups also offers separate paid online therapy services for adult users.

== Reception ==
In a 2015 study in the Journal of Mental Health, 7 Cups users reported satisfaction with emotional support delivered by trained volunteer listeners.

Later studies examined 7 Cups in more specific support settings. A 2016 study in JMIR Mental Health described the platform as a supplement to treatment for women with perinatal depression and anxiety, while another study in Internet Interventions described the adaptation of 7 Cups as an adjunct to treatment for people with schizophrenia-spectrum disorders. A 2018 study in JMIR mHealth and uHealth examined 7 Cups as an adjunct support tool for women with postpartum depression.

In April 2025, Mashable reported that some therapists had raised concerns about being listed in 7 Cups' therapist directory without consent. The article cited a LinkedIn post which claimed that more than 130,000 therapists' names appeared in the 7 Cups directory, with only 67 appearing to have verified listings. Therapists and mental health experts quoted by Mashable said the directory could mislead consumers by implying an affiliation with the platform. 7 Cups defended the directory as part of its effort to connect users with offline support, stating that it compiled publicly available information to list therapists and other local resources, and that therapists could request removal from the directory.

== See also ==
- Befrienders Worldwide
- BetterHelp
- Crisis Hotline
- Crisis Text Line
- Talkspace
- Trans Lifeline
- The Trevor Project
