= Lanyrd =

Conference directory website

- Website type: Events, social networking
- Dissolved: September 2013
- Creators: Simon Willison, Natalie Downe
- Website: lanyrd.com
- Commercial: Yes
- Launched: 2010; 16 years ago
- Current status: Defunct

Lanyrd (pronounced and named after "lanyard") was a conference directory website. It was created by Simon Willison and Natalie Downe and launched in 2010. The site was created while the couple were on honeymoon.

The site compiled blog posts, photos and other coverage from events and kept it organised by session and speaker. Users on the site were identified through the Twitter API and events were shown to users based on their contacts on Twitter. The company received $1.4 million in seed funding in September 2011, having participated in the Y Combinator startup incubator program. The company was based in the Old Street Roundabout area in London.

In October 2011, Lanyrd launched an iOS app for iPhone and iPod Touch devices.

To help attendees at the 2012 SXSW Interactive conference in Austin, Texas, Lanyrd launched a special site listing conference sessions and speakers, and letting individuals see which of their friends from Twitter were attending or speaking at the scheduled sessions. They also made the SXSW data available in the form of iPhone and mobile web apps. In addition, Lanyrd produced browser plugins for Google Chrome, Firefox, Opera and Safari to filter tweets which mentioned SXSW or were from SXSW attendees. The website became a useful tool for amplified conferences.

In September 2013, Lanyrd was acquired by Eventbrite. Post-acquisition, the website lanyrd.com suffered downtime, became read-only, and eventually closed, now redirecting to Eventbrite.
