= 280 North =

- Industry: web software
- Founded: 2008
- Founder: Tom Robinson; Francisco Tolmasky; Ross Boucher
- Headquarters: United States

280 North was a web software development startup company formed in 2008 by college friends Tom Robinson, Francisco Tolmasky, and Ross Boucher. It was purchased by Motorola in 2010. Tolmasky and Boucher both previously worked for Apple, on the iPhone and iTunes respectively.

== History ==
They created a software stack that includes Objective-J, which relates to Javascript in the same way that Objective-C relates to C, and Cappuccino, which is a port of the Apple Cocoa API. Cappuccino and Objective-J have been released as open source software. Their first major release was 280 Slides, which is presentation software similar to Apple's Keynote or Microsoft's PowerPoint, but that works entirely in a web browser using JavaScript. Their next project was a drag-and-drop visual integrated development environment for web applications named Atlas, which could work with the iPhone API. Atlas was to be open-sourced, but, after acquiring 280 North, Motorola decided to keep Atlas private.
