= Sixa =

American cloud-computing company

Sixa, Inc.
- Industry: Cloud computing
- Founded: September 2015; 11 years ago
- Founders: Mykola Minchenko; Ievgen Nechaiev
- Headquarters: San Francisco, U.S.
- Area served: Worldwide
- Website: www.sixa.io

Sixa, Inc. is a cloud-computing startup company, which lets the users on-demand access to a personal virtual computer. The company was founded in September 2015, and is headquartered in San Francisco, California.

The company offers custom computers for developers, designers, and gamers with the relevant preinstalled software. The service allows users to access a powerful cloud computer from any device and eliminates the need to buy new hardware, when more computational power is needed. The service is available for Windows, Mac OS X, and Android operating systems.

Sixa has been backed by Y Combinator to join its Summer 2016 batch, and as of July 2016, raised more than $261,000 funding from Startupbootcamp Istanbul, WS Investments, and Y Combinator.

Starting from December 2016, the Sixa service is publicly available for usage. As part of its launch, the company has raised a $3.5 million seed investment in a round led by Tandem Capital.
