= Afriex =

US financial technology company

- Type: Privately held company
- Industry: Financial services
- Founded: 2019; 7 years ago
- Founders: Tope Alabi (CEO), and John Obirije (CTO)
- Headquarters: Wilmington, Delaware, United States
- Area served: Africa, Asia
- Products: Cross-border payment and money transfer services
- Website: www.afriex.com

Afriex is a United States registered financial technology company that provides cross-border payment and money transfer services. Founded in 2019 the company provided international money transfer services to Africa for the African diaspora. It went on to expand its services to other countries including Pakistan and China.

== History ==
Afriex was founded in 2019 by Tope Alabi (Chief Executive Officer) and John Obirije (Chief Technology Officer).

The company joined Y Combinator's Summer 2020 batch, becoming one of the few African-founded startups accepted into the accelerator

Founding rounds included March 2021 - Seed Round: Afriex raised US$1.2 million led by Y Combinator and other investors to expand its remittance and payments infrastructure. and April 2022 - Series A: The company raised US$10 million, led by Dragonfly Capital with participation from EMURGO (Cardano) and other investors, valuing Afriex at roughly US$60 million.

== Operations ==
Afriex initially focused on remittance corridors linking the African diaspora with their home countries. Afriex operates a mobile and web-based wallet that supports person-to-person and business payments. Functions include integration with local financial systems for real-time settlements.

Between 2023 and 2025, the company broadened its reach into Europe and Asia, launching new corridors in China, India, and Pakistan

In June 2023, Afriex and Tech Herfrica supported Nigerian women in agriculture by providing free smartphones, POS devices, microfinance loans, and access to digital resources to enhance their businesses.

As of 2025, Afriex reports operations in more than 40 regions worldwide.
