= Bellabeat =

Jewelry companies of the United States

- Type: Private
- Industry: Wellness
- Founded: 2014
- Founders: Sandro Mur; Urška Sršen
- Headquarters: San Francisco, United States
- Key people: Ricardo Souza (CEO), Urska Srsen (CPO) (Co-Founder)
- Products: Jewelry, software, consumer electronics
- Number of employees: 22 (2025)
- Website: www.bellabeat.com

Bellabeat is a wellness company founded by Urška Sršen and Sandro Mur in 2014. It is best known for its Leaf smart jewelry wearable line. The company has an office in Zagreb. In 2023, the company had a revenue of US$650 million, according to its investor Nordic Eye.

== History ==
Bellabeat was started in 2014 by Croatian mathematician Sandro Mur and Slovenian sculptor Urška Sršen in 2016. In the same year, they participated in the Y Combinator program and finished top of the class (W14). After graduating from Y Combinator they raised a $4.5M seed round.

== Products ==
=== Smart Jewelry ===
The company's main products are wearables available in two models: Leaf and Ivy.

==== Bellabeat Leaf ====
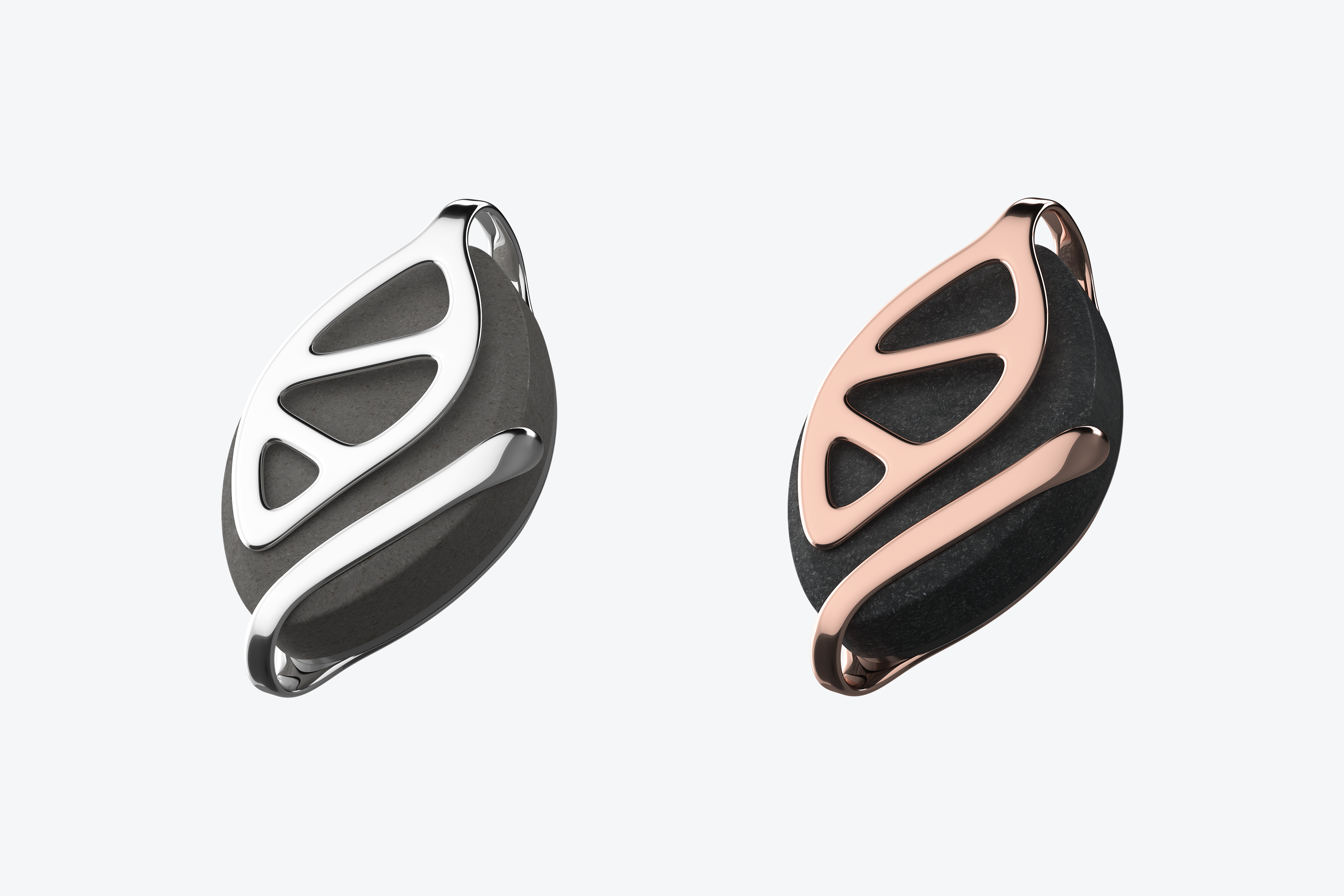
Bellabeat Leaf Urban

A year after its Y Combinator debut, in 2015, Bellabeat launched its first edition wearable tracker called Leaf Nature, characterized by its nature-inspired design and versatility of wear. It is a wearable for women that tracks activity, sleep, and stress resistance. The same year, the company added period and pregnancy tracking to its accompanying app.

In 2016 the company launched Leaf Urban, the updated version of the previous Leaf tracker that featured a more modern, water-resistant design, and updated the corresponding Bellabeat app with additional mindfulness guidance. Leaf collection was later expanded to include Leaf Chakra in 2018 and Leaf Crystal, created in partnership with Swarovski crystals in 2019.

==== Bellabeat Ivy ====
In 2021, Bellabeat launched Ivy, a new and upgraded health & wellness tracker. After selling 20,000 preorders in the first hour of its announcement in late 2020, Bellabeat has sold over 50,000 preorders of its Ivy by January 2021. Ivy is a smart-wearable product made specifically for women, just like its predecessor. It has improved sensors, and monitoring capabilities, and tracks data to support its female wearers' overall well-being, productivity, and reproductive health. It monitors women's biometric data: respiratory rate, resting heart rate, heart rate variability (HRV), and cardiac coherence, as well as lifestyle data in the form of steps, activity, mindfulness, light, deep, and REM sleep, as well as sleep timing and quality to give a comprehensive picture of their performance, health, recovery, and wellbeing. It has a battery life of up to 20 days.

=== Hydration trackers ===
==== Spring ====
Bellabeat launched its smart water bottle Spring in 2016, giving its users an opportunity to automatically track their water intake within the Bellabeat app. Spring runs on Bellabeat proprietary tracking technology developed to work for women's bodies. Through wireless syncing and with a secure data backup, Spring calculates exactly how much water the user needs based on their lifestyle and health (e.g. pregnancy, breastfeeding) and reminds them to drink throughout the day. It is made of glass, BPA-free Tritan™, and high-quality rubber; and features a replaceable-coin cell battery with a battery life of up to 6 months.

=== B.YOU Wellness Line ===
In 2021 Bellabeat expanded its catalog with B.YOU line of wellness accessories. B.YOU line consists of menstrual cups, a yoga mat, and workout bands.

== Mobile apps ==
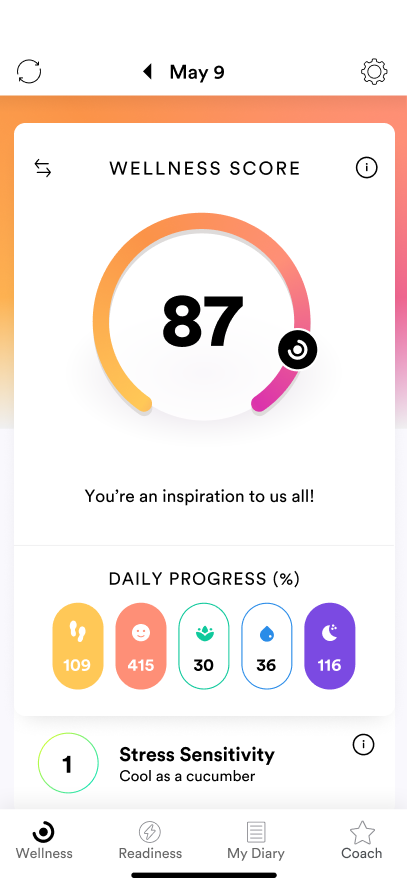
Bellabeat app tracking screen and visible Wellness Score details.

=== Bellabeat App ===
All Bellabeat trackers sync to the Bellabeat app. Released in 2014 for its first wearable tracker, Leaf, the Bellabeat app featured activity, sleep, cycle, hydration, and mindfulness tracking. In 2016 the mindfulness section was expanded with guided meditations for better sleep, focus, and easing of menstrual pain, in addition to breathing exercises. In 2017 Bellabeat launched Airi: a chat-based personal wellness coach (predecessor of Bellabeat Coach) as a subscription-based feature within the Bellabeat app.

In 2021 Bellabeat expanded the cycle-tracking section in the app to give detailed tips on cycle phases and educate users on them.

In 2019, Bellabeat launched Bellabeat+ Membership: a subscription service that provides women with specialized content in all wellness segments. With the subscription (that can be used with and without the device), users receive personalized daily plans and coaching, aligned with their menstrual cycle and goals.

=== Period Diary App ===
In 2018, Bellabeat expanded its catalog with the Period Diary app. Period Diary app is a menstrual cycle tracking app in which women can track their menstrual cycle length, period duration, moods, symptoms, temperature, and input notes.

== Data Safety ==
Following the Roe v. Wade decision, Bellabeat enhanced its encryption protocols by introducing an extra layer of safeguard known as Private Key Encryption (AES-256) Security Feature. Private Key Encryption (PKE) functions by encrypting the user's cycle and pregnancy data in a manner that makes it inaccessible to anyone other than the user. This data can only be decrypted with a unique personal key held exclusively by the user. When users choose to enable PKE, their data remains confidential, inaccessible to anyone but themselves.

== Partnerships ==
- 2018: Bellabeat partners with Swarovski to launch Bellabeat Leaf Crystal, created with Swarovski crystals.
- 2021: Bellabeat partners with Poosh by Kourtney Kardashian for the Poosh Your Wellness Festival, where the company held a solo panel with the topic "Living by Your Cycle With Bellabeat" led by Bellabeat's co-founder Urška Sršen and Shayna Taylor, a holistic nutritionist.
- 2023: Bellabeat hosts a Wellness Summer Power dinner at Nobu in Malibu, featuring Olivia Culpo as the host and attended by celebrities including James Charles, Sophia Culpo, Aurora Culpo, Montana Tucker, Sarah Stage, and others.
- 2023: Bellabeat Partners with The Body Shop on the Beyond Skin Deep wellness bundle that combines Bellabeat’s Ivy wearable device with The Body Shop’s products.
