= Bee Free Honee =

Apple-based vegan alternative to honey

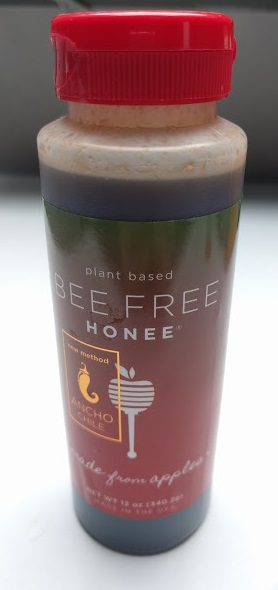
- Inventor: Katie Sanchez
- Inception: 2012
- Website: beefreehonee.com

Bee Free Honee was an apple-based vegan alternative to honey that achieved recognition and funding from Shark Tank. Produced from apples, lemon juice, and cane sugar, it could be used as a replacement for honey in recipes. The product could be consumed by young children and by people with an allergy to honey. In 2019, the company went out of business.

== History ==
The product was accidentally developed in 1999 by Katie Sanchez while she was making apple jelly. The company was established in 2012, with a production facility in River Falls, Wisconsin. After being featured on Shark Tank in February 2016, sales quadrupled and the company moved production from Wisconsin to Texas.

Company co-owner Melissa Elms claimed that by not using bees for production, the product was beneficial to honeybee populations, which she said were often exposed to unsuitable environments in commercial production.

== Products ==
The main ingredients in Bee Free Honee were apple juice, cane sugar, and lemon juice. Flavored variations included ancho chile, mint, and slippery elm. The products were most often sold in stores that specialize in organic/natural foods, including H-E-B, Sprouts Farmers Market, Vitamin Cottage Natural Grocers, Wegmans, and Whole Foods Market.

Bee Free Honee was featured at the Specialty Food Association's Summer Fancy Food Show in 2016 and Winter Fancy Food Show in January 2017.
