= Quartzy =

Laboratory management company

- Type: Private Company
- Industry: Laboratory Software; Scientific Products Vendor
- Founded: 2011
- Founder: Jayant Kulkarni; Adam Regelmann
- Headquarters: Hayward, California
- Key people: Jayant Kulkarni; CEO; Adam Regelmann; COO
- Services: Laboratory management services Procurement services
- Number of employees: 60 Employees
- Website: www.quartzy.com

Quartzy is an online lab management platform and scientific research supply marketplace. It is a startup company based in Hayward, California. Quartzy features include collaborative order requests and supply tracking for labs and research groups, inventory management tools, and product quotes for price comparisons. Quartzy is used by more than 200,000 scientists worldwide.

== History ==
=== Founding (2011) ===
Quartzy was co-founded in 2011 by Jayant Kulkarni and Adam Regelmann, who met at Columbia University as PhD students. Kulkarni and Regelmann remain at Quartzy as CEO and COO, respectively.

=== The Quartzy Shop (2018) ===
In early 2018, Quartzy officially launched its online marketplace known as the Quartzy Shop (formerly the Quartzy Catalog). To date, the marketplace provides access to over three million products and boasts a community of over 1,000 suppliers from across the life science industry. Currently, only Quartzy users based in the United States can purchase through the Quartzy Shop.

Following the launch of the Quartzy Shop in 2018, the company expanded operations to a nearby Redwood City warehouse.

== Awards ==
In 2008, while still in beta, Quartzy received St. Louis' Washington University's Olin Cup, coming out on top of 44 other contestants which was the largest pool of competitors in the Olin Cup's twenty-two year history.

In 2011, Quartzy won Business Insider's Startup 2011 competition.

== Fundraising ==
Quartzy has raised nearly $25 million in total financing, including a Y Combinator-backed seed round, and subsequent Series A and Series B rounds.
