= Upsolve =

Nonprofit online web application

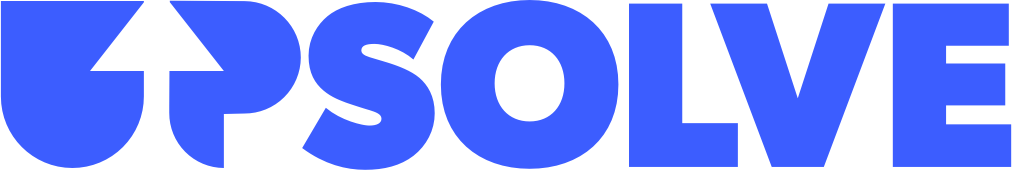
- Founder: Rohan Pavuluri, Jonathan Petts, Mark Hansen
- Type: 501(c)(3) nonprofit organization
- Region served: United States
- Services: Legal Aid
- Website: upsolve.org

Upsolve is a nonprofit online web application whose goal is to make the process of filing for Chapter 7 bankruptcy more accessible to low-income Americans.

== History ==
Upsolve was founded in 2016 by Rohan Pavuluri, a then-research assistant in Harvard Law School's Access to Justice Lab, lawyer Jonathan Petts, and software engineer Mark Hansen. The company received seed funding from Y Combinator, the Legal Services Corporation, the Robin Hood Foundation, Harvard University, and former Google CEO Eric Schmidt.

Upsolve began with residents of New York City before expanding to the rest of the United States. As of 2026, Upsolve has been used to eliminate more than $1.1 billion in debt for over 25,000 families.

== Services ==
Upsolve's primary service is a web-based tool that allows users to file for bankruptcy for free. Potential users take an online screener to see if they qualify for assistance. If the user is qualified, they then answer a series of questions about their financial situation, and Upsolve's application populates the bankruptcy forms. After the paperwork review is finished, users print and deliver their completed bankruptcy paperwork to the court on their own. Upsolve is free for end users.

Upsolve also offers online educational resources about bankruptcy and debt.
