= OrderAhead =

Former online food ordering company

- Type: Private
- Industry: Online food ordering
- Founded: 2012; 14 years ago in Palo Alto, California
- Founders: Jeffrey Byun; Henry Lee
- Fate: Acquired by Square Inc.

OrderAhead was a mobile ordering and payments company that allowing users to order food for pickup from local restaurants.

OrderAhead was acquired by Square Inc. in late 2016.

== History ==
OrderAhead was founded by Jeffrey Byun and Henry Lee in 2012 after they completed Y Combinator. The founders started OrderAhead so that customers could easily order food for pickup without having to wait to order, wait to pay or wait to have their food prepared. The company's service was made available via smartphone apps and was free for users.

OrderAhead started in Palo Alto, California, but quickly expanded to the greater Bay Area after raising a seed round in the summer of 2012. After raising Series A funding one year later in 2013, OrderAhead expanded nationally to major metropolitan areas like San Francisco, Los Angeles, Houston, Denver, Chicago and New York City.

Square Inc. acquired OrderAhead in late 2016 to complement its existing Caviar online food ordering service.

== Funding ==
OrderAhead raised $10.5 million in funding from Marc Benioff (CEO of Salesforce), Eric Schmidt (Chairman of Google), Jerry Yang (Founder of Yahoo!), Adam D'Angelo (first CTO of Facebook), Geoff Ralston (President of Y Combinator), August Capital, Matrix Partners, Menlo Ventures, SV Angel, CrunchFund, Initialized Capital and Y Combinator.
