= Gigster =

American dot-com company

- Headquarters: Austin, Texas
- Owner: Virtasant
- Founders: Roger Dickey; Debo Olaosebikan
- CEO: Michael Kearns
- Website: gigster.com

Gigster provides a service that allows users to get tech projects built on demand. It was co-founded by Roger Dickey and Debo Olaosebikan and based in San Francisco, California. They received seed funding from Greylock Partners, Bloomberg Beta, as well as notable angel investors and founders Naval Ravikant of AngelList, Justin Waldron of Zynga, and Emmett Shear of Twitch, among others. They were a part of Y-Combinator's Summer 2015 class.

On December 7, 2015, Gigster announced its $10m Series A funding round led by Andreessen Horowitz, which will be used to further build the startup's AI and machine learning technology. The company announced on August 29, 2017, that they had raised $20 million in investments led by RedPoint Ventures for its Series B funding round, which included existing investor, Andreessen Horowitz and first time tech investor and retired basketball star, Michael Jordan. By this time the company had received a total funding of $32.5 million.

On May 26, 2021, Gigster announced that it had been acquired by Ionic Partners, an Austin-based firm that buys and operates enterprise software businesses.

On November 1, 2023, Gigster acquired CodersRank, a Debrecen, Hungary-based platform that ranks IT developers. The purchase was announced earlier in September of the same year.

On March 26, 2024, Ionic Partners announced Gigster had been sold to cloud optimization services company Virtasant.
