= LeadGenius =

- Industry: Sales intelligence, Software as a Service
- Founded: 2011
- Headquarters: Berkeley, California, United States
- Area served: North America; Great Britain; Australia; New Zealand; South America; India; Serbia; Philippines
- Key people: Mark Godley (CEO); Prayag Narula (Founder & Chairman)
- Number of employees: 758
- Website: www.leadgenius.com

LeadGenius is a privately held software as a service, marketing automation, and demand generation startup located in Berkeley, California. The company uses a combination of artificial intelligence and human computation to identify and communicate with targeted sales leads. The company's crawlers comb through websites, business directories, government filings, and credit data to train a machine learning system for business-to-business sales.

LeadGenius is the first crowdsourcing company to set a minimum wage for its workers tied to the cost of living in the country they are working in.

The company launched in Y Combinator’s Summer 2011 class under the name MobileWorks. It has since raised $6 million in venture funding from investors such as Sierra Ventures, Andreessen Horowitz, Alexis Ohanian, Mitch Kapor, Dave McClure, and Sam Altman.
