= WakeMate =

The WakeMate was an electronic device with sensors intended to be used to monitor the sleep state of the user using actigraphy. It would connect to the user's mobile phone via Bluetooth to record sleep data and to signal the phone to wake them in the lightest phase of sleep within the 20-minute window prior the desired alarm time. It also had a suite of online tools to help people maximize the efficiency of their sleep and improve their sleep quality.

The WakeMate project was delayed multiple times, which caused some backers in the project to pull out before the device had even shipped. The product eventually shipped to a limited number of backers. However, the launch was plagued by a USB charger recall and compatibility issues with Android.

== Perfect Third ==
Perfect Third Inc.
- Company type: Private
- Founded: December 2009
- Headquarters: San Francisco, California, USA
- Key people: Greg Nemeth, Co-founder Arun Gupta, Co-founder; Craig Lewiston, Ph.D. Tom Davis
- Website: www.WakeMate.com/

Perfect Third Inc. is a consumer electronics company founded in December 2009 by Arun Gupta, a Yale University student, and Greg Nemeth, a Columbia University student. They were joined shortly thereafter by Craig Lewiston, who had recently earned his doctorate from the Harvard-MIT Division of Health Sciences and Technology, and Tom Davis, a seasoned startup veteran who previously ran TicketStumbler. Located in San Francisco, CA, the company received seed funding from Y Combinator which allowed them to launch their first product, the WakeMate.

Competing products to the WakeMate include the aXbo alarm clock, the Sleeptracker wristwatch, and the Zeo Personal Sleep Coach.

== End of production/ceasing of business ==
On June 27, 2012, Arun Gupta stated the following in a blog post: "...as many of you have guessed, we have exhausted our capital and will no longer be making any more WakeMates. Currently our plan is to keep the service going while we work on open sourcing the technology. Hopefully this will ensure that you can continue to enjoy the product and its benefits even after the company no longer exists"

== USB charger recall ==
After a report that the USB charger brick included in the first shipment of WakeMates spontaneously burst into flames, Perfect Third Inc. recalled all USB charger bricks and warned its customers by email and phone not to use them.
