= Tara AI =

American artificial intelligence platform

- Type: Private
- Founders: Iba Masood; Syed Ahmed
- Headquarters: San Jose, California
- Website: tara.ai

Tara AI is a platform designed to help modern software teams manage and deliver across their product development lifecycle.

Founded by Iba Masood and Syed Ahmed, Tara AI is based in San Jose, California. It was originally Gradberry, a recruiting platform that connected technical workers to employers, and was part of Y Combinator Winter 2015 class. In 2016, the company evolved into Tara AI, a product management platform that uses machine learning to predict the technical tasks, engineering resources and timelines needed for new software projects.

Tara AI has raised $13 million in investment from a number of notable venture capital firms and angel investors including Aspect Ventures, Y Combinator, Slack Fund, Jaan Tallinn of Skype and Di-Ann Eisnor of Waze.

In October 2017, Tara AI won a $500,000 prize at the fourth annual 43North business plan competition.
