= Modal (company) =

American software company

- Formerly: Next Technologies (2015-2016); Drive Motors (2016-2019)
- Type: Private
- Industry: E-commerce, Automotive industry
- Founded: 2015
- Headquarters: San Francisco, United States
- Website: modalup.com

Modal, formerly known as Next Technology Inc., was an American-based company in San Francisco, that sold software for a dealership's website, allowing car shoppers to purchase new and used cars online.

In 2016, the company, then known as Next Technologies, entered the seed accelerator, Y Combinator.

== History ==
Modal was founded in 2015 out of Khosla Ventures. The idea came because there were very few solutions allowing users to buy new cars online but also allowing auto dealers to sell them.

After spending a number of months looking for a car himself after he sold his first business to Yahoo! in 2013, the founder realized that the process was incredibly time-consuming and could be streamlined. In an interview with TechCrunch he stated, "it became shockingly clear that ecommerce had not reached new cars." When speaking about the competition, they suggested that the vast majority of large car sales websites were effectively online magazines, listing cars that you could purchase in person.

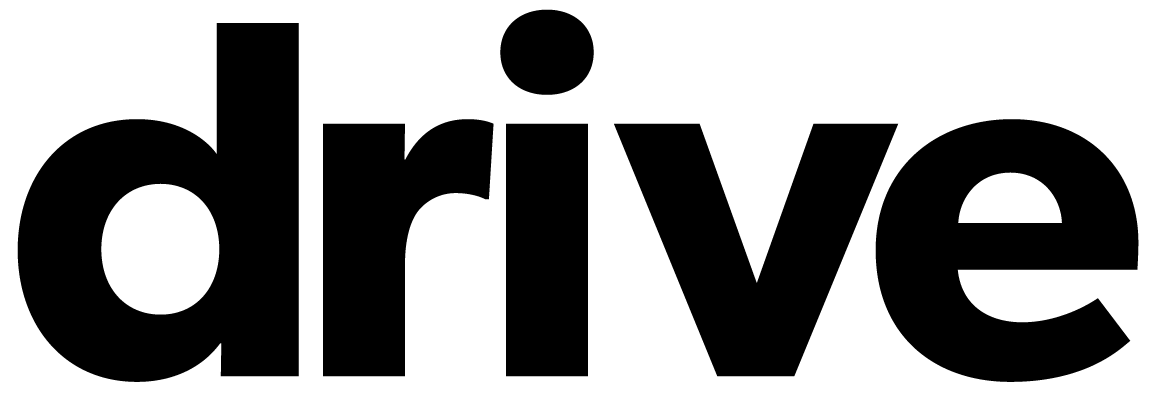
The former Drive Motors logo, used until June 2019

After the idea of the company was established, Next Technologies then entered seed accelerator Y Combinator in 2016. This was following rapid growth in Modal's revenue. It was stated that it took only 10 months for their turnover to rise to $1 million in annual recurring revenue following their official launch. They also attended the AutoVentures Conference in 2016, where Modal was listed as a contestant for the main award and pitched their product as the future of the auto industry. Drive Motors was announced the winner following Modal's presentation. In June 2019, the company rebranded as Modal Commerce.

Modal signed up their first enterprise client to date in 2016, with Asbury Automotive Group agreeing to test the software at a handful of their dealerships. Later that year, Asbury announced they were extending the software to more of their dealerships. Modal consequently added clients including Honda, Nissan, Porsche, Lithia, Group One, and others.

== Mechanics ==
Dealers are able to implement the software and sell cars directly from the dealership website.
