= Streak (company) =

American software company

- Trade name: Streak
- Type: Privately held company
- Industry: Customer relationship management
- Founded: 2012
- Founder: Aleem Mawani; Omar Ismail
- Headquarters: San Francisco, California, United States
- Area served: Worldwide
- Products: Customer relationship management software for Gmail
- Website: streak.com

Streak is a customer relationship management (CRM) platform built directly into Gmail. It is designed to help small businesses, startups, and service-based teams manage workflows and communications without leaving their inbox. Streak is primarily used as a CRM and to manage emails, email marketing, and sales tracking.

== History ==
Streak was founded in 2011 by Aleem Mawani, a former Google product manager, and Omar Ismail. It was accepted into Y Combinator's Summer 2011 class and graduated from the accelerator in early 2012. It has received $1.9 million in venture capital.

The company held a soft launch of its platform in January 2012; it entered open beta in March of that year.

Streak was released as an iOS application in August 2013. It added email read receipts to its platform in early 2014.

In December 2016 Streak launched a contacts management feature that allows customers to create contacts straight from emails in their Gmail inbox and automatically enrich them with contact information.

In 2017, Streak released a Gmail Add-on that allows users to access Streak data inside Gmail mobile apps on iOS and Android.

In 2018, Streak was named Google's Technology Gsuite Partner of the Year.

In 2020 Streak transitioned to a fully remote company due to COVID-19 restrictions and safety measures. Streak also released features that automatically add emails with contacts to each record in the CRM.

In 2021 Streak launched automatic follow-up for their mail merge feature.

In 2023 Streak launched AI features that automate data entry, answer questions about deals in your CRM, generate summaries and suggestions about deals, and help build custom pipelines without code.

== Product ==
Streak is a spreadsheet-style customer relationship management plug-in for Gmail that supports both Google Chrome and Safari web browsers. Users connect the plugin to their Google account via OpenID and do not share their login credentials with the program.

Streak integrates directly with other tools, including Slack, Calendly, Google Calendar, and Typeform, but users must upgrade to the company's pro+ plan in order to use native integrations as the base plan does not offer any. Streak customers can also use Zapier to connect with additional tools and automate workflows.
