= Kickback (video game platform) =

Esports platform

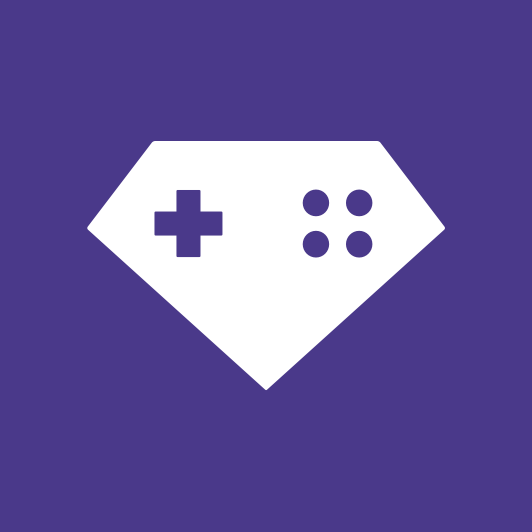
- Website type: Electronic sports
- Available in: English
- Headquarters: San Francisco
- Website: kickback.com
- Launched: February 2, 2015
- Current status: Offline

Kickback.com was an esports platform that allowed users play competitive video games. Players of any skill level could enter ranked matches and compete for a chance to win tournaments using their skills in-game. Kickback integrated on top of popular existing games, where the service adds matchmaking, anti-cheat and support. These features were available to all users, but were made optional for users playing for fun. The site was backed by Y Combinator in 2015.

== History ==
The website kickback.com launched on February 2, 2015, in San Francisco, California by hosting paid tournaments in Minecraft. Players competed against one another in player-versus-player matches for a chance to win prizes. On March 2, 2015, Kickback announced its Y Combinator backing and integration with PayPal. On December 1, 2015, Kickback began allowing users to play Counter-Strike: Global Offensive.

== Games offered ==
Kickback offered a variety of Counter-Strike: Global Offensive minigames. Users are matched player versus player with the objective of defeating an opponent through in-game kills. The site runs daily events that are free to enter and award real prizes.
