= Listia =

Online goods trading app

Listia Inc.
- Company type: Private
- Founded: August 6, 2009
- Headquarters: Mountain View, California, U.S.
- Area served: Worldwide
- Founders: Gee-Hwan Chuang, James Fong
- Key people: Gee-Hwan Chuang (CEO), James Fong (President)
- Industry: Internet, online marketplace
- Employees: 70+
- Website: www.listia.com

Listia is an online marketplace for trading goods between individuals. The platform has a system known as PTS to facilitate the trades. Users earn PTS for giving away items they no longer need and can then use those PTS to get items that other users have listed. The marketplace uses an auction system where users bid on each other's items until the auction ends and the highest bidder wins. The user who listed the item then arranges for a pickup or ships the item directly to the winner.

== History ==
Listia originally received funding of $15,000 from startup funding firm Y Combinator. Listia was launched on August 6, 2009. In October 2009, Listia received $400,000 in funding from Implistic Capital in an angel round with Adam Pearsall joining the board of directors. Listia uses a system called "Listia Credits" to help facilitate trading on the site. Users can either purchase credits directly from the company, or earn credits by participating in the site such as by placing items in the marketplace.

By 2010, the site passed the 1,000,000 auction mark and was named one of the top 100 websites of 2010 by PCMag.

In April 2011, Listia raised an additional $1.75M in funding from Andreessen Horowitz, SV Angel, and other investors. Listia announced that they had over 1 million registered users and listings in over 3,000 cities by January 2012. They also launched their Android and iPhone apps in early 2012.

On July 18, 2012, Listia launched a rewards store which allows users to trade credits for new goods from online retailers. Led by General Catalyst, they raised $9 million in Series A funding in October 2013 to be used on developing their mobile apps.

In 2018, during a period of declining growth, Listia introduced a cryptocurrency named XNK to their marketplace. The currency used the Ethereum blockchain and could be used in and outside of Listia. A total of 500 Million XNK was created, 6% reserved for existing Listia users, 30% sold via private presale, and two public capped presales, 32% retained by Listia, vested over 3 years, 32% allocated for distribution and incentivizing the network, released over 3 years.

== Department of Labor investigation ==
In 2014, Listia agreed to pay $190,546 in back wages and damages to 61 current and former employees after the Wage and Hour Division of the Department of Labor conducted an investigation. The company violated the Fair Labor Standards Act's overtime, minimum wage, and record-keeping provisions. Customer service employees were not paid overtime for hours worked beyond 40 in a week and in cases minimum wage. Listia also misclassified some employees as exempt from overtime pay and considered others as volunteers. The volunteers were not paid only given credits towards purchases on the company's website.
