= Wefunder =

Crowdfunding service

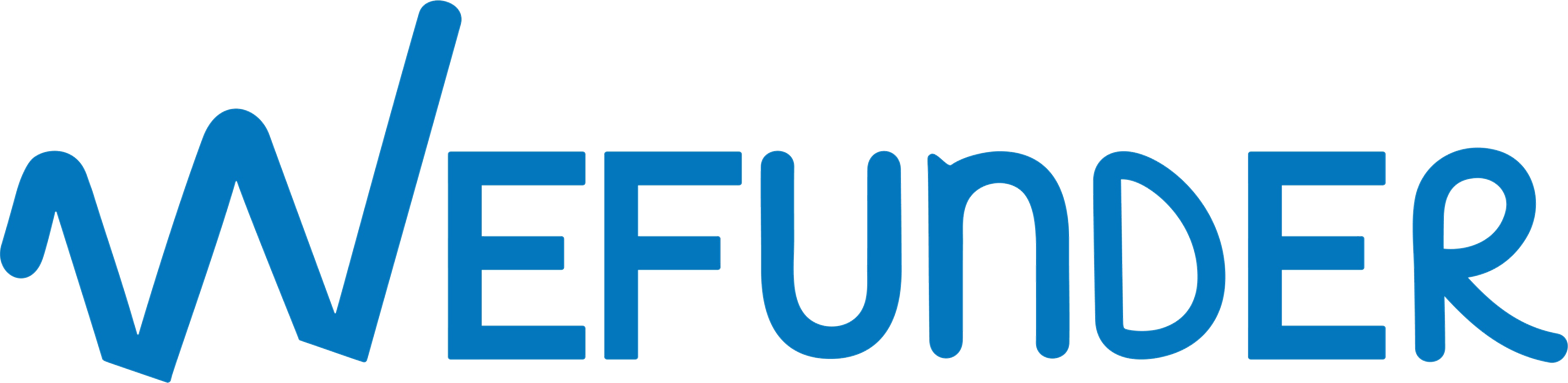
- Industry: Crowdfunding
- Founded: 2011
- Founders: Nick Tommarello; Mike Norman; Greg Belote
- Headquarters: San Francisco, California, United States
- Services: Entrepreneurship, startups, investment
- Website: wefunder.com

Wefunder is an online service that allows individual investors to crowdfund startup companies. Wefunder uses a provision in the 2012 JOBS Act that allows unaccredited investors to purchase equity in early stage private companies.

== Foundation ==
Wefunder was founded by Nick Tommarello, Mike Norman, and Greg Belote in 2012. The startup incubator Y Combinator backed Wefunder during its development and launch.

Wefunder is predicated upon the idea that anyone, regardless of wealth, should be able to invest in a company.

== See also ==
- Comparison of crowdfunding services
