= PagerDuty =

American technology company

PagerDuty, Inc.
- Type: Public
- Traded as: NYSE: PD
- Industry: Information technology, Incident management, Information technology operations
- Founded: 2009; 17 years ago
- Founders: Alex Solomon; Andrew Miklas; Baskar Puvanathasan
- Headquarters: San Francisco, California, United States
- Key people: John DiLullo (CEO); Eric Prengel (CFO)
- Revenue: ▲US$493 million (2026)
- Net income: ▲US$173 million (2026)
- Number of employees: 1,242 (2025)
- Website: pagerduty.com

PagerDuty, Inc. is an American cloud computing company specializing in a SaaS incident management platform for IT operations departments.

PagerDuty is headquartered in San Francisco with offices in Toronto, Atlanta, London, Lisbon, Tokyo, and Sydney. Its platform is designed to alert clients to disruptions and outages. The software operates as a standalone service or can be integrated into existing IT systems.

== History ==
The company was founded 2009 in Toronto, Ontario, by University of Waterloo graduates Alex Solomon, Andrew Miklas, and Baskar Puvanathasan. The company was incubated at Y Combinator.

In July 2016, the former CEO of Keynote Systems, Jennifer Tejada, was named CEO of PagerDuty.

In June 2018, PagerDuty launched Event Intelligence, a product designed to analyze incoming digital signals and human responses to communicate incident response suggestions to operators when new incidents occur. At its industry conference in September 2018, the company also launched PagerDuty Visibility and PagerDuty Analytics.

In March 2019, PagerDuty filed its S-1 with the SEC in anticipation of its IPO and in April 2019, PagerDuty went public on the New York Stock Exchange.

On January 21, 2023 PagerDuty CEO Tejada's layoff memo was criticized for insensitivity for inappropriately quoting Martin Luther King, announcing promotions of executives, and tone deafness.

In May 2026, John DiLullo was named CEO and Jennifer Tejada became Executive Chair

In June 2026, Eric Prengel was named Chief Financial Officer

== Funding ==
PagerDuty raised a seed funding round of $1.9 million in 2010, followed by a Series A round that raised $10.7 million in January 2013. As of 2018, the company has raised over $170 million in venture funding.

PagerDuty announced a funding round in April 2017 led by Accel. The $43.8 million round included existing investors Andreessen Horowitz, Bessemer Venture Partners, Baseline Ventures and Harrison Metal.

In September 2018, PagerDuty raised $90 million in a round led by T. Rowe Price and Wellington Management.

== Acquisitions ==
In October 2020, PagerDuty completed the acquisition of Rundeck, a provider of DevOps automation.

In March 2022, PagerDuty completed the acquisition of Catalytic, a no-code automation platform.

In November 2023, PagerDuty completed the acquisition of Jeli, an incident management startup.

== See also ==
- Icinga
- VictorOps
