= House Party New Orleans Style =

Compilation album by Professor Longhair
- Released: 1987
- Recorded: 1971, 1972
- Studios: Deep South, Ardent
- Genre: New Orleans rhythm and blues
- Label: Rounder
- Producer: Quint Davis

Professor Longhair chronology
Mardi Gras in New Orleans (1982)	House Party New Orleans Style (1987)	Mardi Gras in Baton Rouge (1991)

House Party New Orleans Style (subtitled The Lost Sessions, 1971–1972) is a compilation album by the American musician Professor Longhair, released in 1987. The tracks were originally intended for Atlantic Records; the recording sessions were among Professor Longhair's first after his live performing comeback in the early 1970s.

The album won a Grammy Award for "Best Traditional Blues Recording".

== Production ==
The album was produced by Quint Davis. The songs were recorded in 1971 and 1972; they were stored in the vaults of Bearsville Records before being released in 1987. Snooks Eaglin played on all of the tracks; Ziggy Modeliste played on a handful. The album includes some of Professor Longhair's lesser known material.

== Critical reception ==
Professional ratings
Review scores
Source	Rating
AllMusic	3/5 stars
Robert Christgau	A−
The Encyclopedia of Popular Music	3/5 stars
MusicHound Blues: The Essential Album Guide	4/5 stars
The Penguin Guide to Blues Recordings	4/5 stars
The Rolling Stone Album Guide	3/5 stars

The New York Times noted that "these are among the liveliest, truest records the Professor ever made, among other things the prototype of the kind of pianism found on Little Richard's early rock records." Robert Christgau opined that "Fess's wobbly vocals and careening piano apotheosized [New Orleans'] crazy independence the way Allen Toussaint's did (if not does) its pop affability."

The Washington Post listed the album as one of the best of 1987, calling it "an infectious mid-career look at Longhair's rumbaesque piano (and Zig Modeliste's propulsive drumming)." The Toronto Star deemed it "a resilient and hungry work that ranks as one of Longhair's best records, an instant collectible."

AllMusic wrote that "Eaglin's flashy, inventive solos were excellent contrasts to Longhair's rippling keyboard flurries and distinctive mix of yodels, yells, cries and shouts." The Penguin Guide to Blues Recordings determined that "the rhythm sections are outstandingly funky, and Snooks Eaglin, then also making his return to the limelight, plays at the height of his inventiveness."

== Track listing ==
No.	Title	Length
1.	"No Buts and No Maybes"
2.	"Gone So Long"
3.	"She Walk Right In"
4.	"Thank You Pretty Baby"
5.	"501 Boogie"
6.	"Tipitina"
7.	"Gonne Leave This Town"
8.	"Cabbagehead"
9.	"Hey Little Girl"
10.	"Big Chief"
11.	"Cherry Pie"
12.	"Junco Partner"
13.	"Every Day I Have the Blues"
14.	"'G' Jam"
15.	"Dr. Professor Longhair"
