= New Orleans blues =

Music genre from Louisiana, United States

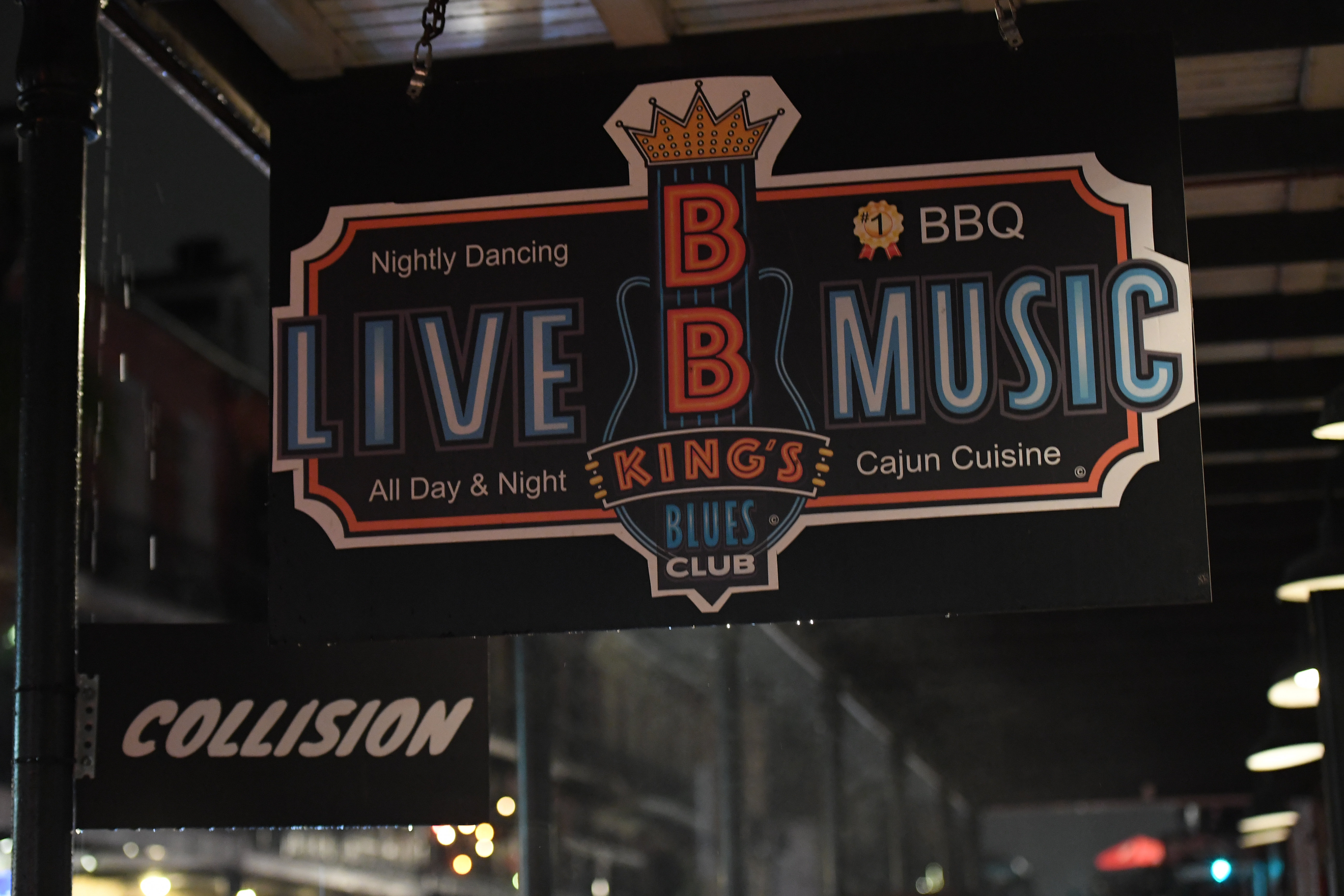
- Live blues music club in New Orleans
- Stylistic origins: Blues; calypso; Dixieland; rhythm and blues
- Cultural origins: 1940s–1950s, New Orleans, U.S.
- Typical instruments: Keyboards; guitar; bass; drums; horns

Other topics
- Louisiana blues; New Orleans rhythm and blues; Swamp blues

Guitar Slim – "The Things That I Used to Do" (1953)
Guitar Slim's "The Things That I Used to Do" influenced rock and soul music.

New Orleans blues is a subgenre of blues that developed in and around the city of New Orleans, influenced by jazz and Caribbean music. It is dominated by piano and saxophone, but also produced guitar bluesmen.

== Characteristics ==
As a style, New Orleans blues is primarily driven by piano and enlivened by Caribbean rhythms and Dixieland music. It is generally cheerful in delivery regardless of the subject, with a laidback tempo and complex rhythms falling just behind the beat. Vocals range from laidback crooning to full-throated gospel shouting.

== History ==
New Orleans is generally credited as the birthplace of jazz music, but has attracted less attention as a center of the blues. The 12-bar blues were well known in the city before most of the rest of the country. Buddy Bolden's band was remembered at excelling on playing blues before 1906. Anthony Maggio's "I Got the Blues" was an early example of published blues sheet music from 1908. The Original Dixieland Jass Band's "Livery Stable Blues", generally considered the first jazz record, is in a fast blues form.

Although New Orleans has drawn to it and produced fewer blues musicians than other major US urban centers with large African-American populations, it has been the center of a distinctive form of blues music, which has been pursued by some notable musicians and produced important recordings, such as Professor Longhair and Guitar Slim, who both had regional, R&B and even mainstream chart hits.

In the period after World War II, a very large number of recordings were produced in the city that were informed by the blues, but had strong R&B and pop influences that anticipated rock and roll and are difficult to classify. Among these artists, the most highly regarded and most influenced by the blues was piano-player Professor Longhair, whose signature song "Mardi Gras in New Orleans" (1949) and other recordings such as "Tipitina" (1959) were major R&B hits, and who remained a central figure in New Orleans music through to his death in 1980.

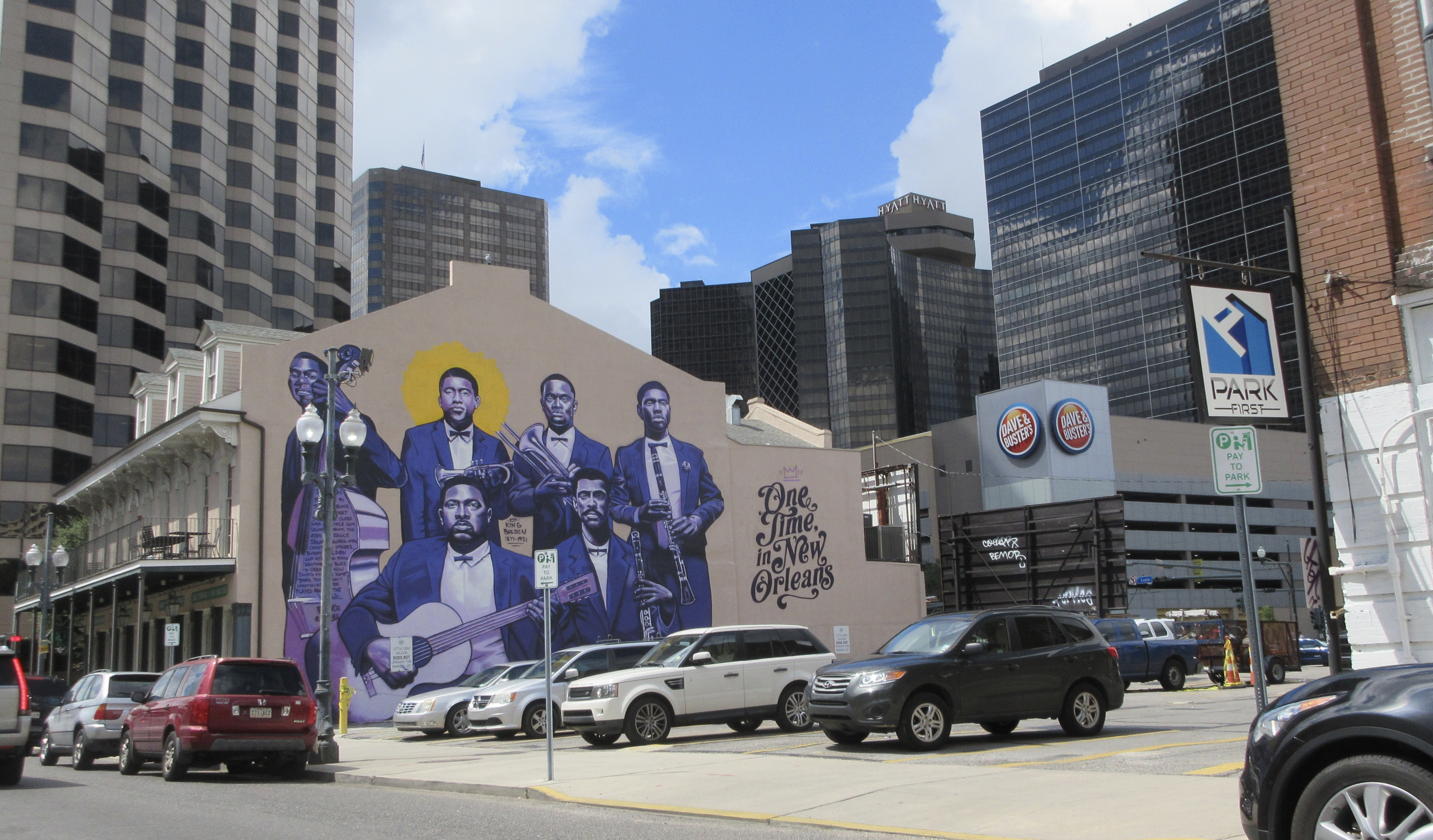
Mural of Buddy Bolden's band

Other significant figures playing keyboard-based blues include James Booker, whose organ instrumental "Gonzo" reached the top 50 in the Billboard chart in 1960 and was followed by a series of minor single hits.

The most significant blues guitarist to emerge from the city in the post-World War II period was Guitar Slim, originally from the Delta. His "The Things That I Used to Do", which combined gospel, blues and R&B, was a major R&B hit in 1954 and may have influenced the development of later soul music. It also influenced the development of rock music, having been included in The Rock and Roll Hall of Fame's 500 Songs that Shaped Rock and Roll, featuring an electric guitar solo with distorted overtones.

Other important blues guitarists from the city include Snooks Eaglin, who recorded both acoustic folk and electric-based R&B, and Earl King, who composed blues standards including "Come On" (covered by Jimi Hendrix and Stevie Ray Vaughan) and Professor Longhair's "Big Chief". Also among the major figures of the genre was Dr. John, who began as a guitarist and enjoyed regional success with the Bo Diddley–influenced "Storm Warning" in 1959, and had a highly successful career from the 1960s after moving to Los Angeles, mixing R&B with psychedelic rock and using New Orleans-themed aesthetics.

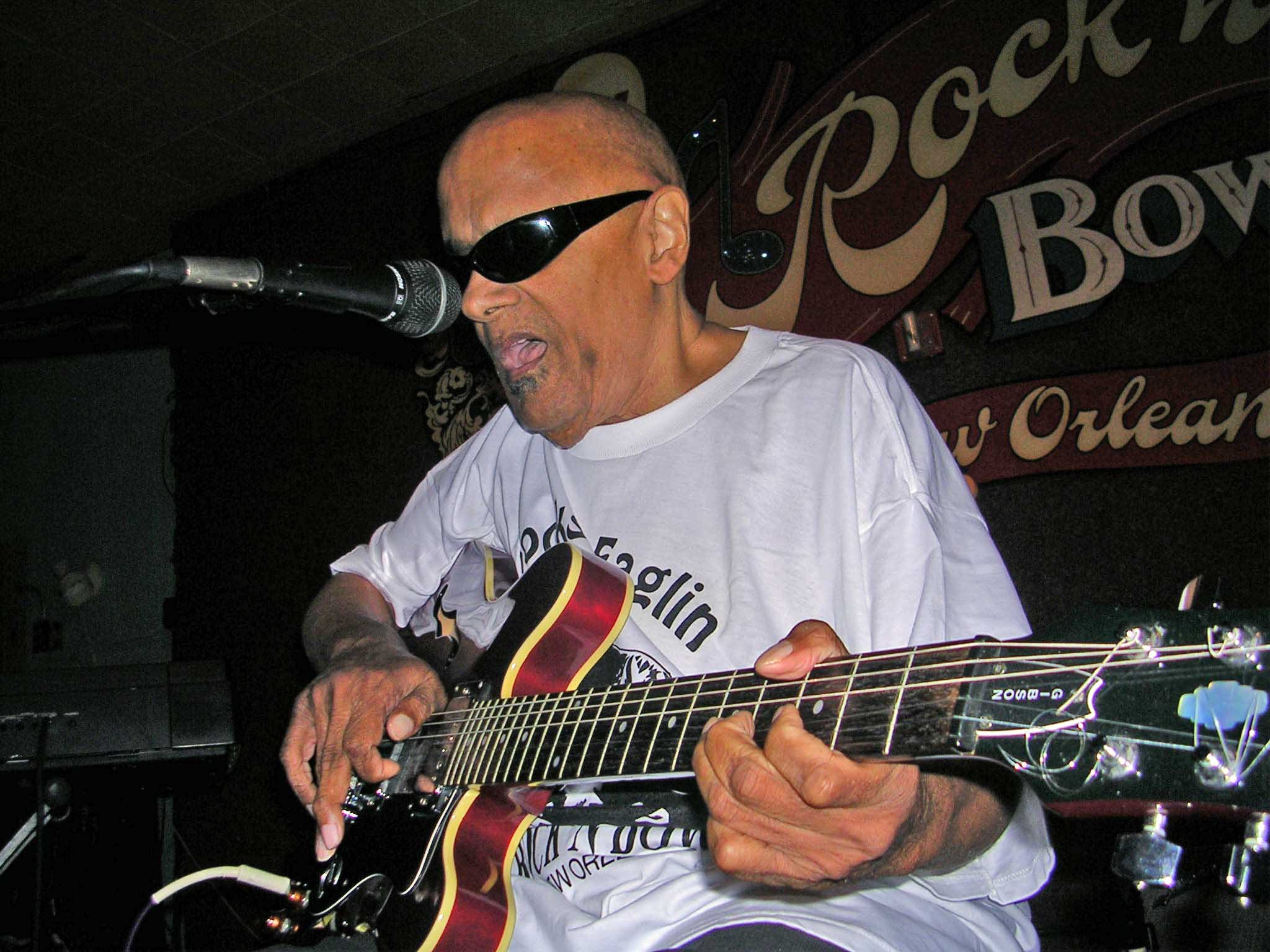
Snooks Eaglin performing in 2006

The careers of many New Orleans bluesmen declined in the 1960s, as rock and roll and soul began to dominate popular music, but revived in the 1970s, when there was renewed interest in their recordings.

== See also ==
- Steamboat Willie
