= The Last Mardi Gras =

Live album by Professor Longhair
- Released: 1982
- Recorded: February 1978
- Venues: Tipitina's, New Orleans
- Genres: New Orleans rhythm and blues, rock 'n' roll
- Label: Atlantic/Deluxe
- Producer: Albert Goldman

Professor Longhair chronology
Mardi Gras in New Orleans 1949–1957 (1981)	The Last Mardi Gras (1982)	Mardi Gras in New Orleans: Live 1975 Recording (1982)

The Last Mardi Gras is an album by the American musician Professor Longhair, released in 1982. It was part of the Atlantic/Deluxe series. The album was reissued in 2014.

== Production ==
The Last Mardi Gras was produced by Albert Goldman. It was recorded at Tipitina's in February 1978; because the 1979 Mardi Gras was suspended due to a police strike, this was the last Mardi Gras at which Professor Longhair performed. Songs from the same dates were included on the albums Big Chief and Rum and Coke. The cover art was created by Milton Glaser. Professor Longhair was backed by a pickup rhythm section, as members of his regular band were unavailable for the engagement. Alfred "Uganda" Roberts contributed on congas. Professor Longhair called the music "rum-boogie".

== Critical reception ==
Professional ratings
Review scores
Source	Rating
AllMusic	4/5 stars
Robert Christgau	A
The Encyclopedia of Popular Music	4/5 stars
Lincoln Journal Star	4/5 stars
MusicHound Rock: The Essential Album Guide	4/5 stars
The Rolling Stone Album Guide	4/5 stars

The New York Times said that Professor Longhair's "piano playing and crafty singing show no signs of diminished powers." The Commercial Appeal stated that "anyone with a feeling for the Crescent City needs it." The Philadelphia Inquirer opined that the better Professor Longhair live album was Live on the Queen Mary. The Lincoln Journal Star praised the singing and playing of Professor Longhair but called the backing band "clumsy".

The Democrat & Chronicle labeled him "a first-rate blues vocalist [and] a witty lyricist". The Detroit Free Press dubbed The Last Mardi Gras "a rock 'n' roll masterpiece". Robert Christgau wrote that "the lazy insouciance of the tempos and horn parts here sure feels like New Orleans to me."

Rolling Stone called the album "essential music of uplift for people suffering from the human condition." AllMusic concluded that it "was arguably the best performance recording of Longhair ever captured."

== Track listing ==
Side one

1. "Big Chief"
2. "Jambalaya"
3. "Mess Around"
4. "Cry to Me"
5. "Rum & Coca Cola"

Side two

1. "Got My Mojo Working"
2. "Everyday (I Have the Blues)"
3. "Doin' It"
4. "Gone So Long"

Side three

1. "She Walks Right In / Shake, Rattle & Roll"
2. "Hey Now Baby"
3. "Bald Head"
4. "Stag-o-Lee"

Side four

1. "Tipitina"
2. "Her Mind Is Gone"
3. "How Long Has That Train Been Gone"
4. "Boogie Woogie" (instrumental)
5. "Carnival in New Orleans"
