= Make It Funky (film) =

2005 American documentary film

Make It Funky!
- American DVD cover
- Directed by: Michael Murphy
- Written by: Michael Murphy
- Produced by: Cilista Eberle; Michael Murphy
- Starring: Allen Toussaint; Bonnie Raitt; and others
- Narrated by: Art Neville
- Edited by: Christy Suire
- Music by: Art Neville (musical consultant); Steve Jordan (musical director); Allen Toussaint (musical director); Gregory Davis (musical director)
- Production companies: Bottom of the Ninth Productions; Michael Murphy Productions
- Distributed by: Sony Pictures Releasing
- Release date: September 9, 2005
- Running time: 110 minutes
- Country: United States
- Language: English

Make It Funky! is a 2005 American documentary film directed, written and co-produced by Michael Murphy. Subtitled in the original version as "It all began in New Orleans", the film presents a history of New Orleans music and its influence on rhythm and blues, rock and roll, funk and jazz. The film was scheduled for theatrical release in September 2005, but was pulled by distributor Sony Pictures Releasing so that they did not appear to take commercial advantage of the devastation caused by Hurricane Katrina.

Using an April 27, 2004 concert at the Saenger Theatre in New Orleans as the backdrop, the film also includes archival performance footage, still photographs, and interviews with many musicians and others involved in the early years and heyday of New Orleans music. The film is narrated by Art Neville, and the interviewees include local music pioneers Allen Toussaint, Lloyd Price, Irma Thomas, and Aaron Neville, contemporary New Orleans musicians Kermit Ruffins and Trombone Shorty, as well as rock musicians Bonnie Raitt and Keith Richards, who describe the influence of New Orleans music on their careers. The opening screen text states "the story of how this music was made reflects a struggle for social and racial equality between black and white America. It is also a story of how music can unite, uplift, and in the case of New Orleans, create a sound that influenced the world."

== Synopsis ==
The historical portions of Make It Funky! are interspersed with performances by some of the city's most well-known musicians and bands, including from the April 2004 concert. Many of the performers are also featured in interview settings.

The film opens with an older New Orleans African-American musician teaching a young boy how to accompany his piano playing using a trumpet mouthpiece. This is followed by several snippets of interviews with various musicians discussing what makes New Orleans music different from other genres; all agree it is the unique beat, the second line back beat that helps audiences dance to the music.

A discussion follows of the multicultural influences that helped shape the New Orleans musical sound over the centuries: colonial rule by the Spanish and French, as well as immigrants from the Caribbean Islands and enslaved Africans. The jazz funeral and second line traditions are discussed, as well as the role of the Social Aid and Pleasure Clubs. By the late 1940s, the second line brass band traditions were in danger of being lost, but the tradition was revived by younger musicians such as Danny Barker, followed later by the Dirty Dozen Brass Band, who incorporated R&B sounds such as that of Fats Domino into their repertoire.

The film next discusses the ever-present musical sounds heard throughout New Orleans neighborhoods, and in particular the history of the Tremé neighborhood and the musical giants who lived and performed there, including Louis Armstrong and Danny Barker. Kermit Ruffins talks about the history of Congo Square, and Troy Andrews and Sammie Williams discuss what it was like to grow up in Tremé.

Jon Cleary, Bob French, Michele Barard and Steve Jordan discuss the influences of Caribbean and African cultures on New Orleans music, including the practice of voodoo. A history of the Mardi Gras Indians is presented by Cyril and Charles Neville, including the influence of their uncle Big Chief Jolly.

The New Orleans style of piano playing is discussed, mentioning the long line of pianists to come out of the city, and featuring James Booker, Dr. John, Fats Domino and Professor Longhair. Allen Toussaint describes the technical differences between the styles of Domino and Longhair. The Southern-ness of the music is discussed by Toussaint, including the inspiration for his composition "Southern Nights".

The impact of racial segregation on the New Orleans music scene is discussed by various interviewees. The importance of the Dew Drop Inn to the local musical community is mentioned, including the nightclub's rejection of racial segregation among musicians and audience members, which was illegal at the time. Earl Palmer talks about how racial segregation was different in New Orleans than the rest of the South, saying "we did everything together except go to school together". Art Neville recalls an incident after playing a gig in Mississippi during the 1950s when a note was left on the windshield of their car saying the band was being watched by the Ku Klux Klan. DJ, music promoter and record store owner Jim Russell tells of the troubles he encountered as a white man who wanted to play black music on his radio programs, as well as booking Art Neville and The Hawkettes into a white-only nightclub.

A brief history of J&M Recording Studio is presented by co-owner Cosimo Matassa, including the studio's policy of ignoring legal segregation and the influence of bandleader, producer and songwriter Dave Bartholomew. Matassa also discussed the recording of several Little Richard hits at J&M accompanied by many New Orleans musicians including drummer Palmer.

Aaron Neville recalls the success of his 1966 hit song "Tell It Like It Is" and its supporting tour, but claims he never received any royalties from the song. Keith Richards describes the influence of the sound on early rock and roll, saying New Orleans musicians "put the roll into rock". The importance of The Meters on early funk is shared by Jon Cleary and Art Neville. Charles Neville discusses the various musical influences on The Neville Brothers, and the next generation of Neville musicians. The film's historical narrative ends by returning to the importance of the unique beat of the New Orleans sound.

== Cast ==
=== Interviewees ===
The following musicians or others involved in the New Orleans music scene are named and seen onscreen in an interview setting, often for small amounts of screen time.

- Aaron Neville
- Ahmet Ertegun
- Allen Toussaint
- Art Neville
- Bob French
- Bonnie Raitt
- Charles Neville
- Cosimo Matassa
- Cyril Neville
- Earl Palmer
- Fred Johnson Jr., Greg Stafford, and Benjamin Jones of Black Men of Labor
- Gregory Davis
- Ian Neville
- Irma Thomas
- Jim Russell
- Jon Cleary
- Keith Richards
- Ken Jackson, grandson of Dew Drop Inn founder Frank Painia
- Kermit Ruffins
- Michele Barard, voodoo scholar
- Sammie Williams of Big Sam's Funky Nation
- Steve Jordan
- Sylvester Francis
- Troy Andrews
- Victor Harris, Mardi Gras Indian chief

=== Performers ===
==== Full-length performances ====
The following musicians or bands are seen in the live concert segments of the film, with house band Poppa Funk's Boys, led by drummer Steve Jordan. Full-length performances of the songs (listed in order of appearance) are:

- Kermit Ruffins, Irvin Mayfield and Troy Andrews, performing "Skokiaan"
- Dirty Dozen Brass Band with guests Irvin Mayfield and Troy Andrews, performing "My Feet Can't Fail Me Now"
- Big Sam's Funky Nation with guest Troy Andrews, performing "Bah Duey Duey"
- Monk Boudreaux and the Golden Eagles, performing "Sew, Sew, Sew"
- Toussaint and Jon Cleary, performing "Tipitina"
- Toussaint and Irma Thomas, performing "Old Records"
- Toussaint and Lloyd Price, performing "Lawdy Miss Clawdy"
- Earl Palmer with guest vocalist Ivan Neville, performing "Rip It Up"
- Allen Toussaint, performing a medley of his compositions "Fortune Teller", "Working in the Coal Mine", and "A Certain Girl"
- Bonnie Raitt, performing "What is Success"
- The Neville Brothers, performing "Fire on the Bayou"
- Walter "Wolfman" Washington, performing "Barefootin'"
- Snooks Eaglin with guest George Porter Jr., performing "Come On (Let the Good Times Roll)"
- Keith Richards performing "I'm Ready"
- Finale: all performers playing "Hey Pocky Way"

Henry Butler, Jonny Lang, Joss Stone, Leo Nocentelli, The Blind Boys of Alabama, Irene Sage and The Dixie Cups also performed at the concert, but their appearances were not included in the final cut of the film.

==== Archival performance footage ====
The following musicians are seen in archival video clips (no full-length performances):

- Dave Bartholomew
- Dr. John
- Fats Domino
- Professor Longhair

==== Other onscreen appearances ====
- Quint Davis appears on stage in the role of MC for the concert portions of the film
- New Birth Brass Band, Treme Brass Band and Fi Yi Yi Mardi Gras Indians are seen in brief street performances
- Alvin Batiste Sr. and Joseph C. Bloom II appear in the opening scene

== Production ==
Make it Funky! was director Murphy's first feature-length documentary film.

=== Development ===
The original working title of the film was Southern Nights, with the concert promoted as "Make It Funky". The idea for the film was born at a visit by director Murphy and co-producer Cilista Eberle to a local music club named Donna's Bar & Grill, which features many of the city's brass bands at its North Rampart Street location. After the original idea to focus on an (unnamed) major New Orleans musician as the film's star fell through, the film evolved into a broader look at the city's rich musical history and its influence on several musical genres, including R&B, funk, rock, and jazz. Two years of planning and negotiations preceded the closing of the production and distribution deals. Overall, the project took five years to complete.

Director Murphy is a fifth-generation New Orleanian and his company (Michael Murphy Productions) has produced numerous music-related programs for television, radio and live satellite broadcasts. Murphy rejected suggestions that the concert showcase be filmed in New York, which would have allowed for easier coverage by national media outlets. He said that it was a "very important element" that "all of the local musicians and guest stars will walk the same streets as Louis Armstrong, Danny Barker, Sidney Bechet, Fats Domino, breathe the same air, sit on the same bar stools."

Although the film's exact budget is not known, one article described it as "seven-figures" with another saying it was "close to $3 million", with much of the financing coming from a Hibernia National Bank loan collateralized in part by Murphy's personal assets including a second mortgage on his home. This documentary was the first film that the bank ever considered financing, although others have followed. The Louisiana Economic Development Corporation guaranteed a percentage of the bank loan. The film was shot in New Orleans with a predominantly local crew, which made the production eligible for approximately $300,000 in credits from Louisiana's then-two year old film industry tax credit incentive program. The New Orleans music and film commissions, as well as the governor's office of film and television development, were all integral to the early development of the project.

Daniel Roth of Revolution Studios in Los Angeles was the film's executive producer and brokered the film's distribution deal with Columbia TriStar Home Entertainment, which was later picked up by Sony. The original plan was to distribute the film worldwide to theaters, television and on DVD, with the goal of giving "the city's indigenous music an enormous boost by cultivating a deeper understanding of New Orleans' role in the development of contemporary music".

=== Pre-production ===
Columbia TriStar did not officially approve the project until March 25, 2004, leaving the producers with only four weeks to plan the concert, book performers, promote the show and sell tickets. The "Make It Funky" concert was held on April 27, 2004, which was the Tuesday between the two weekends of the New Orleans Jazz & Heritage Festival, when the city would experience a critical mass of performers and music fans available for the show.

=== Filming ===
The concert portion of the film was shot in a high-definition format with 11 cameras, and was recorded in surround sound. The concert at the Saenger Theatre lasted for almost six hours.

Murphy said that he shot over 30 hours of footage all over the city, capturing images of neighborhoods that were later damaged or destroyed by the hurricane.

== Release ==
The film had been scheduled for a wide theatrical release. Instead, as a consequence of Hurricane Katrina and Sony's decision to pull the film from theaters so as to not appear exploitative during the tragic time, it had a limited, single-day theatrical release on September 9, 2005 in New York at the Quad Cinemas in Manhattan and in Los Angeles at Grauman's Chinese Theatre. The Los Angeles showing was made free and open to the public, with attendees asked to fill a hat with money to be given to New Orleans musicians that were displaced by the storm.

On the one-year anniversary of Hurricane Katrina in 2006, Sony released the film in a dozen cities across the United States as a reminder of the cultural importance of New Orleans to the country.

== Critical reception ==
Reviews of the film were generally positive. On Rotten Tomatoes, the film has an approval rating of 93% based on 14 reviews, with an average score of 7.4/10. At Metacritic, which assigns a weighted average rating, the film has received an average score of 75 out of 100, based on 7 critics, indicating "generally favorable reviews".

Variety published a pre-release review in June 2005, with reviewer Eddie Cockrell saying Art Neville "narrates the town's history with satisfying detail" and further describes the narration as "illuminating". He praised the "spectacular trumpet challenge among Kermit Ruffins, Irvin Mayfield and Troy Andrews" and wrote that the film "could enjoy perfunctory big screen playdates but will really shake its tail feathers on cable and DVD". He said the film's "only missteps are a Vegas-like medley of locally-penned early rock tunes performed by Toussaint with the Jordan-organized house band and a heartfelt but strangely out-of-place run through "I'm Ready" featuring Palmer, Washington and effusive guest Keith Richards".

In his New York Times review published in conjunction with the film's limited release in that city, only 11 days after Hurricane Katrina made landfall, critic A. O. Scott wrote "Make it Funky! is the most heartbreaking movie I've seen in some time, all the more so because sorrow is the last thing on its mind. Michael Murphy's documentary, which celebrates the musical traditions of New Orleans … can also serve as an apt, wrenching elegy for the city's unique contribution to American culture."

New York Daily News reviewer Elizabeth Weitzman gave the film a rating of three stars, and began her review of the film's opening in New York with "Though it was clearly intended as a joyous celebration, timing has turned Make It Funky, Michael Murphy's exultant documentary on New Orleans' musical heritage, into a poignant requiem." She concludes with "A suddenly vital biography … pays apt homage to the unique gifts New Orleans has given its country over the last century. Watching it ought to inspire anyone to return the favor."

For the film's Los Angeles premiere, critic Kevin Thomas described the film as "infectious" and went on to write "there's not a second in this film that isn't a reminder that New Orleans in its architecture, cuisine and multicultural diversity as well as in its music is a unique and major center of culture. Murphy has made a film more valuable than he surely ever could have imagined."

A Boston Herald review by Larry Katz stated that the film "is a guaranteed blast, whether you are an expert in Crescent City sounds or a total newcomer wondering what makes New Orleans music so special" and described it as "a most entertaining history lesson".

The only "rotten" review of the film posted on Rotten Tomatoes was penned by Kyle Smith for the New York Post where he gave the film a rating of 2.5 out of 4, writing "The musicians swear this is dance music, but the beats are far too ponderous to get a rise out of the hip-hop generation."

A review of the DVD in Rolling Stone magazine stated "had the human tragedy of Hurricane Katrina been averted, this exploration of Crescent City musical history would have been a happy treat. Instead, its effect is keenly piercing."

Mike Clark's three-star DVD review in USA Today said "Scheduled for release long before Katrina turned it into an odd mix of exuberance and heartbreak, this documentary/concert tribute to New Orleans is a bit clinical in the early going. Yet even these scenes are incalculably packed with extra meaning because they preserve geography and hangouts now permanently altered at best."

New Orleans native Craig Lindsey, reviewing the newly released DVD for The News & Observer wrote "I could hardly get myself to sit down and watch 'Make it Funky!' without being reminded of what the film has come to represent. Before Katrina, it was a loving valentine to a city and its heritage. Now, it's an ill-timed, unfortunate tribute."

== Screenings ==
Because Sony pulled the film from its planned release schedule, theatrical screenings were limited. The documentary was shown at a few film festivals prior to its official theatrical release on September 9, 2005, and had several benefit screenings in the aftermath of Hurricane Katrina.

=== Pre-release screenings ===
- New Orleans Center for Creative Arts (April 28, 2005), pre-release benefit screening
- New Orleans Jazz & Heritage Festival, Allison Miner Music Heritage Stage (April 29, 2005), preview of selected film scenes plus an interview with Michael Murphy, Earl Palmer, Art Neville, and Cosimo Matassa
- National Academy of Recording Arts and Sciences, Memphis Chapter pre-release screening (June 23, 2005)
- American Film Institute Silverdocs Festival (June 16, 2005)
- Northwest Film Center in conjunction with the Waterfront Blues Festival, Portland, Oregon (July 2, 2005)
- Napa Valley Wine Country Film Festival (July 28, 2005); opening film of the festival
- Satchmo SummerFest, New Orleans (early August 2005); the first film to be shown at the then-five year old free music festival

=== Post-Katrina benefit screenings ===
- Madison Square Garden, "From the Big Apple to the Big Easy" benefit for Hurricane Katrina relief efforts (September 20, 2005); selected film scenes were aired during breaks from a star-studded, five-hour musical fundraiser
- WorkPlay Theatre, Birmingham, Alabama (October 19, 2005) to benefit the Red Cross of Central Alabama and MusiCares
- Roxie Theater, San Francisco, California (beginning October 28, 2005) to benefit Louisiana Rebirth (Restoring the Soul of America)
- North Boulevard Festival of Lights, Baton Rouge, Louisiana (December 2, 2005) to benefit FilmAid International; director Murphy and some of the musicians in the film were present at the screening
- Renaissance Village, FEMA trailer community that served as a temporary home to nearly 1700 Katrina evacuees, Baker, Louisiana (December 3, 2005)
- St. Louis, Missouri (December 10 and December 16, 2005) to benefit the Louisiana Cultural Economy Foundation
- Mexicali Blues, Teaneck, New Jersey (February 28, 2006) Mardi Gras Day screening to benefit various Katrina charities, with director Murphy in attendance
- Ashland Armory, Ashland, Oregon (April 7–8, 2006) to benefit FilmAid International
- Ozone Film Festival, Covington, Louisiana (April 22, 2006), to benefit the New Orleans Film Festival, which was cancelled in October 2005 due to Hurricane Katrina

=== Other film festival screenings ===
- Zeitgeist Multi-Disciplinary Arts Center, New Orleans (November 19, 2005) celebrating the center's 19th anniversary, with director Murphy in attendance
- Miami Jazz Film Festival, Miami, Florida (August 13, 2006); closing festival film
- ReelheART International Film Festival, Toronto, Canada (June 23, 2007)

=== Television ===
- VH1 aired the film starting on September 14, 2005, to help mobilize relief efforts for New Orleans and the surrounding areas that were devastated by the hurricane. The film was shown simultaneously on VH1, VH1 Classics and VH1 Soul, with the proceeds directed to Mercy Corps and MusiCares. At the time, the airing of a film on television at the same that it was in planned theatrical release was unprecedented.
- Black Entertainment Television aired the film on September 18, 2005.
- Sony Movie Channel aired the film on July 15, 2014, as part of its second annual "Music Movie Month".

== Awards and honors ==
- 2006: won the Jury Award (First place) in the Music category at the Napa Valley Wine Country Film Festival
- 2007: won second place in the Music and Dance category at the ReelheART International Film Festival
- Metacritic named the film as the number 71 best movie of 2005
- Named as one of the Top 4 DVDs of 2005 by OffBeat magazine

== Home media ==
The DVD was released on September 27, 2005, by Sony Pictures Home Entertainment. The release date had been announced prior to Hurricane Katrina. It was intentionally released on DVD soon after the planned theatrical release so it could be part of an educational curriculum on music history.

Extra features on the DVD include the option to view the concert only, three short documentary features that "look at the culture of New Orleans, the role of family and the city's notable musicians" and a deleted scene titled "Showdown at the Funky Butt" of a trombone battle between Big Sam and Trombone Shorty at a nightclub.

The DVD released in the U.S. contains subtitles in Chinese, English, Portuguese, Spanish and Thai and includes closed captioning for the hearing impaired.

The film was also released on DVD in Australia, Spain, France, Germany, and Italy.

The film was released to streaming services on January 3, 2016.
