= Martin Scorsese Presents the Blues: Piano Blues =

Soundtrack album by Various
- Released: September 9, 2003
- Recorded: December 1938 – July 2003
- Genre: Blues, jazz, stride, boogie-woogie
- Length: 1:15:33
- Language: English
- Label: Columbia Records, Legacy Recordings, Sony
- Producer: Clint Eastwood, Bruce Ricker, Jeffrey Peisch
- Compiler: Clint Eastwood, Bruce Ricker

Professional ratings
Review scores
Source	Rating
Allmusic	4.5/5 stars

Martin Scorsese Presents the Blues: Piano Blues is the soundtrack to the documentary film directed by Clint Eastwood. This is the seventh part of the critically acclaimed television documentary series Martin Scorsese Presents The Blues shown on PBS in September 2003. This collection of music represents what Eastwood said "...in my film Piano Blues I'm trying to investigate who influenced everyone, and who the great players were."

== Track listing ==
No.	Title	Writer(s)	Artist	Length
1.	"How Long Blues"	Leroy Carr	Jimmy Yancey	3:01
2.	"Boogie Woogie Prayer. Pt. 1"	Albert Ammons, Meade Lewis, Pete Johnson	The Boogie Woogie Boys	2:20
3.	"How Long Blues"	Carr	Count Basie And His Orchestra	3:01
4.	"Driftin' Blues"	Charles Brown, Johnny Moore, Eddie Williams	Johnny Moore's Three Blazers	3:13
5.	"The Fat Man"	Antoine Domino, Dave Bartholomew	Fats Domino	2:35
6.	"Tatum Pole Boogie"	Art Tatum	Art Tatum	2:24
7.	"Tipitina"	Henry Roeland Byrd	Professor Longhair	2:37
8.	"What'd I Say, Parts 1 and 2"	Ray Charles	Ray Charles	6:27
9.	"Good Morning Mr. Blues"	Otis Spann	Otis Spann	3:22
10.	"Backward Country Boy Blues"	Duke Ellington	Duke Ellington, Charles Mingus, Max Roach	6:19
11.	"Blue Monk"	Thelonious Monk	Thelonious Monk	6:14
12.	"Piney Brown Blues"	Big Joe Turner, Pete Johnson	Big Joe Turner, Jay McShann	5:24
13.	"Mission Ranch Blues"	Jay McShann, Dave Brubeck	Jay McShann, Dave Brubeck	3:47
14.	"The Ladder"	Joe Turner	Big Joe Turner	2:21
15.	"Honey Dripper"	Joe Liggins	Dr. John	3:35
16.	"World Full Of People"	Henry Townsend	Henry Townsend	4:00
17.	"Big Chief"	Earl King	Dr. John	2:59
18.	"Carmel Blues"	Joe Willie "Pinetop" Perkins, Marcia Ball	Joe Willie "Pinetop" Perkins, Marcia Ball	2:57
19.	"Travelin' Blues"	Dave Brubeck	Dave Brubeck	3:19
20.	"How Long Blues"	Leroy Carr	Dr. John, Pete Jolly, Henry Gray	5:13

== See also ==
- The Blues Radio Series
