= Doctors, Professors, Kings & Queens =

2004 compilation album by various artists

Doctors, Professors, Kings and Queens: The Big Ol' Box of New Orleans

Compilation album by Various artists
- Released: October 26, 2004
- Genres: Rock, blues, R&B, jazz, zydeco
- Label: Shout! Factory
- Producer: Chuck Taggart

Professional ratings
Review scores
Source	Rating
Allmusic	3.5/5 stars

Doctors, Professors, Kings and Queens: The Big Ol' Box of New Orleans is a 2004 box set compilation gathering 85 songs representing the music of New Orleans from the 1920s to 2003. Represented on the album is a variety of musical genres, including jazz, R&B and blues, and a number of musicians, mingling noted artists such as Louis Armstrong, Fats Domino, Dr. John and the Neville Brothers with less renowned musicians.

== Track listing ==
=== Disc one ===
#	Title	Composer	Performer	Time
1	"Welcome to New Orleans"	(Galactic)	Galactic featuring Theryl Declouet	0:15
2	"Drop Me Off in New Orleans"	(Kermit Ruffins)	Kermit Ruffins	4:28
3	"I'm Walkin'"	(Dave Bartholomew/Fats Domino)	Fats Domino	2:07
4	"Iko Iko"	(James "Sugarboy" Crawford/Barbara Anne Hawkins/Rosa Lee Hawkins/Joan Marie Johnson)	Dr. John	4:08
5	"Potato Head Blues"	(Louis Armstrong)	Louis Armstrong & His Hot Seven	2:54
6	"My Darlin' New Orleans"	(Ron Cuccia/Ramsey McLean/Charles Neville)	Lil' Queenie & The Percolators	4:01
7	"Para Donde Vas (Where Are You Going)"	(Traditional)	The Iguanas	3:17
8	"Meet the Boyz on the Battlefront"	(Traditional)	Anders Osborne & Big Chief Monk Boudreaux	4:36
9	"Ain't Got No Home"	(Clarence "Frogman" Henry)	Clarence "Frogman" Henry	2:19
10	"Feel Like Funkin' It Up"	(Keith "Bass Drum Shorty" Frazier/Philip Frazier, III/Kermit Ruffins)	Rebirth Brass Band	5:05
11	"Zydeco Gris-Gris"	(Alphonse Ardoin/Michael Doucet/David Marcentel)	BeauSoleil	3:38
12	"Mother-in-Law"	(Allen Toussaint)	Ernie K-Doe	2:32
13	"That's Enough of That Stuff"	(Marcia Ball)	Marcia Ball	4:30
14	"Confidential"	(Ed Volker)	The Radiators	4:11
15	"Hey Pocky A-Way"	(Joseph Modaliste/Art Neville/Leo Nocentelli/George Porter, Jr.)	The Meters	4:03
16	"I Thought I Heard Buddy Bolden Say"	(Traditional)	Jelly Roll Morton & His New Orleans Jazzmen	3:13
17	"Foot of Canal Street"	(John Boutté/Paul Sanchez)	Paul Sanchez	3:48
18	"Down in Honky Tonk Town" [live]	(Charles McCarron/Chris Smith)	Vernel Bagneris & The Cast Of One Mo' Time	3:01
19	"Rocking Pneumonia and the Boogie Woogie Flu"	(Huey "Piano" Smith/John Vincent)	Huey "Piano" Smith & The Clowns	2:17
20	"More Hipper"	(Jon Cleary & the Absolute Monster Gentlemen)	Jon Cleary & The Absolute Monster Gentlemen	5:28
21	"Release Me"	(Eddie Miller/James Pebworth/William "Mickey" Stevenson/Robert Yount)	Johnny Adams	2:51
22	"Preachin' Blues"	(Sidney Bechet)	Sidney Bechet & His Hew Orleans Feet Warmers	3:13
23	"Jambalaya"	(Hank Williams)	Clifton Chenier	3:35

=== Disc two ===
#	Title	Composer	Performer	Time
1	"Dog Days"	(Leigh Harris/Nicolaas TenBroek)	Leigh Harris	5:49
2	"No City Like New Orleans"	(Earl King)	Earl King	4:33
3	"Salée Dames, Bon Jour"	(Traditional)	Don Vappie, Creole Jazz Serenaders	2:48
4	"Marshall's Club"	(Christine Balfa/Dirk Powell)	Balfa Toujours	3:42
5	"You Can Have My Husband" [live]	(Dorothy LaBostrie)	Irma Thomas	3:13
6	"Go Go"	(Galactic/Erik Jekabson)	Galactic	3:04
7	"Not Too Eggy"	(Glenn Hartman)	New Orleans Klezmer All Stars	2:11
8	"St. James Infirmary"	(Joe Primrose)	Preservation Hall Jazz Band	5:37
9	"Going Back to New Orleans"	(Joe Liggins)	Deacon John Moore	2:45
10	"Hot Tamale Baby"	(Clifton Chenier)	Buckwheat Zydeco	4:08
11	"Fear, Hate, Envy, Jealousy" [live]	(Aaron Neville/Art Neville/Charles Neville/Cyril Neville)	The Neville Brothers	4:25
12	"Poop Ain't Gotta Scuffle No More"	(Mac Rebennack/Allen Toussaint)	James Andrews	5:37
13	"Mardi Gras Mambo"	(Frankie Adams/Ken Elliot/Lou Welsch)	Hawketts	2:16
14	"Ice Cream"	(Howard E. Johnson/Robert King/Billy Moll)	George Lewis's Ragtime Band	5:48
15	"No Doubt About It"	(J. Monque'd)	J. Monque'd	4:08
16	"Don't You Feel My Leg"	(Danny Barker/Blue Lu Barker/J. Mayo Williams)	Dirty Dozen Brass Band	4:17
17	"Dog Hill"	(Wilson Chavis, Jr./Sidney Simien)	Boozoo Chavis	2:38
18	"Au Bord de Lac Bijou"	(Zachary Richard)	Zachary Richard	4:41
19	"Mardi Gras in New Orleans"	(Professor Longhair)	Tuba Fats' Chosen Few Brass Band	6:12

=== Disc three ===
#	Title	Composer	Performer	Time
1	"Shrimp and Gumbo"	(Dave Bartholomew/P. King)	Dave Bartholomew & His Orchestra	2:05
2	"St. Phillip Street Breakdown"	(George Lewis)	Dr. Michael White	5:01
3	"Going Back to Louisiana"	(Robert E. Osborn)	Clarence “Gatemouth” Brown	4:40
4	"Tell It Like It Is"	(George Davis, Jr./Lee Diamond)	Aaron Neville	2:41
5	"The Saints"	(Eric Clay/Traditional)	Coolbone	3:15
6	"Canaille (You're Cute, But You're Sneaky)"	(Geno Delafose)	Geno Delafose & French Rockin' Boogie	3:06
7	"Carnival Time"	(Al Johnson)	Al Johnson	2:41
8	"La Negra Tomasa"	(Guillermo Rodriguez Fiffé)	Fredy Omar Con Su Banda	5:04
9	"Let the Good Times Roll"	(Shirley Goodman/Leonard Lee)	Shirley & Lee	2:24
10	"The Broken Windmill"	(Traditional)	Tom McDermott & Evan Christopher	3:53
11	"Way Down"	(Champion Jack Dupree)	Champion Jack Dupree	3:48
12	"Hallelujah" [live]	(Traditional)	Raymond Myles with The Rams	3:58
13	"I Hear You Knocking"	(Dave Bartholomew/Antoine Domino/Pearl King)	Smiley Lewis	2:45
14	"La Crçve De Faim/Starvation 2-Step"	(David Greely/Steve Riley)	Steve Riley & The Mamou Playboys	3:07
15	"Main Street Blues"	(Josh Caffery)	Red Stick Ramblers	4:37
16	"Sea Cruise"	(Huey "Piano" Smith)	Frankie Ford	2:44
17	"Tee-Nah-Nah" [live]	(Overton Lemon)	Henry Butler	3:49
18	"Smoke That Fire"	(James "12" Andrews/Troy Andrews)	The New Birth Brass Band	3:06
19	"Give Him Cornbread" [live]	(Beau Jocque)	Beau Jocque & The Zydeco Hi-Rollers	4:15
20	"I Like It Like That"	(Chris Kenner/Allen Toussaint)	Chris Kenner	1:57
21	"Classified (Version Two)" [live]	(James Booker)	James Booker	3:08
22	"Southern Nights"	(Allen Toussaint)	Allen Toussaint	3:34

=== Disc four ===
#	Title	Composer	Performer	Time
1	Tipitina	(Roy Byrd)	Professor Longhair	2:39
2	Party	(Wilson Turbinton)	Wild Magnolias	4:43
3	Dr. Jazz	(Walter Melrose/Joseph Oliver)	Ellis Marsalis	4:29
4	Ooh Poo Pah Doo	(Jessie Hill)	Troy Andrews	3:15
5	South of I-10	(Sonny Landreth)	Sonny Landreth	3:40
6	Lipstick Traces (On a Cigarette)	(Allen Toussaint)	Benny Spellman	2:25
7	The Right Key but the Wrong Keyhole [live]	(Eddie Green/Clarence Williams)	Charmaine Neville Band with Reggie Houston & Amasa Miller	5:46
8	Rip It Up	(Robert "Bumps" Blackwell/John Marascalco)	Little Richard	2:23
9	Royal Garden Blues	(Clarence Williams/Spencer Williams)	Kid Ory's Creole Jazz Band	3:31
10	Stoned, Drunk & Naked	(Anders Osborne)	Anders Osborne	4:52
11	Laissez Faire (Let It Be)	(Bruce Daigrepont)	Bruce Daigrepont	2:28
12	Digga-Digga-Do [live] New Orleans	(Dorothy Fields/Jimmy McHugh)	Jazz Vipers	5:25
13	Tailspin	(Walter "Wolfman" Washington/Christine Washington)	Walter “Wolfman” Washington	3:03
14	Lawdy Miss Clawdy	(Lloyd Price)	Lloyd Price	2:32
15	Havin' Fun in New Orleans	(Eddie Bo)	Eddie Bo	5:01
16	King of the Mardi Gras	(Tim Laughlin)	Tim Laughlin	4:03
17	Red Beans	(McKinley Morganfield)	Snooks Eaglin	3:53
18	S.U.V.	(Mem Shannon)	Mem Shannon & The Membership	3:43
19	'Tits Yeux Noirs (Little Black Eyes)	(Lawrence Walker)	Savoy-Doucet Cajun Band	3:49
20	Lazy River [live]	(Hoagy Carmichael/Sidney Arodin)	Pete Fountain & His Band	3:39
21	Do You Know What It Means to Miss New Orleans?	(Eddie DeLange/Louis Alter)	Louis Armstrong	2:58
