= Groovesect =

- Origin: New Orleans, LA, USA
- Genres: Funk/Rock/Jazz/Soul
- Years active: 2006–present
- Members: Danny Abel, Guitar; Nick Krawitz, Keys; Tim Sullivan, Saxophones/Flute; Eric Vogel, Bass; Colin Davis, Drums; Alfred 'Uganda' Roberts, Congas/Percussion; Justin Aliperti, Manager
- Website: http://www.groovesect.com/

Groovesect is a New Orleans funk band featuring conga/percussion player Alfred 'Uganda' Roberts and tours regularly with ex-James Brown band leader and original Parliament/Funkadelic member Fred Wesley.

== History ==
Groovesect was founded in 2006 by New Orleans musicians who had played together in various incarnations since they were eighteen, blending syncopated funk beats and jazz rhythms with rock and soul. Since 'Uganda' joined the band in the spring of 2007, Groovesect has been voted the #1 Funk Band and #2 Contemporary Jazz Band in the 2007 Best of the Big Easy Awards sponsored by Where Y'at magazine. Alfred 'Uganda' Roberts is widely known in New Orleans for having been Professor Longhair's only steady band member and touring and recording with The Meters, Dr. John, Herbie Mann, Willie T, and many other New Orleans musicians.

Groovesect's debut album On The Brim was produced by jazz producer John Snyder and released in the spring of 2008. Trombonist Fred Wesley is featured on three cuts and also appears regularly on tour with the band.

== Appearances ==
Groovesect has appeared at the Gathering of the Vibes Music Festival (Connecticut), High Sierra Music Festival (California), Telluride Jazz Festival (Colorado), Waterfront Blues Festival (Oregon), Voodoo Fest (NOLA) and many more. In December 2007 Groovesect was featured by NPR affiliate, KUVO 89.3 (Denver) on a nationally broadcast live performance featuring Fred Wesley and Henry Butler. Groovesect also receives daily airplay on WWOZ 90.7 in New Orleans and on radio stations around the world.
