= Go to the Mardi Gras =

- 1980 reissue cover sleeve

Single by Professor Longhair
- A-side: "Go to the Mardi Gras"
- B-side: "Everyday Everynight"
- Released: 1959
- Recorded: 1959
- Genre: R&B
- Length: 2:45
- Label: Ron
- Songwriters: R. Byrd and T. Terry
- Producer: Joe Ruffino

"Go to the Mardi Gras" or "Mardi Gras in New Orleans" is a New Orleans Mardi Gras–themed R&B song that was performed by Professor Longhair, and recorded several times since 1949. He co-wrote the song with Theresa Terry. The song was covered by Fats Domino and released as a single in 1953. It is now considered an iconic festive song of the New Orleans Carnival season.

== Background ==
Henry Roeland Byrd, better known as Professor Longhair (or nickname "Fess"), was born in Bogalusa and moved to New Orleans with his family as an infant. He reportedly learned to play his instrument on a piano lacking several keys, which some have credited for his unusual technique. He would keep time by kicking his foot against the piano's base. He developed a unique "rhumba boogie" style that combined elements of blues, barrelhouse, and Caribbean influences. He was a pivotal link between early New Orleans piano pioneers such as Tuts Washington and later names such as Fats Domino, Art Neville, Allen Toussaint and Dr. John. His 1950 single "Bald Head" hit No. 5 on the R&B charts, and became his only national hit.

The song's lyrics advise anyone wishing to visit New Orleans to go to the Mardi Gras celebration and witness its various sights, such as to "see the Zulu King on Saint Claude and Dumaine." In 1959, at time of the recording, the Zulu parade, hosted by the Zulu Social Aid & Pleasure Club, took an improvised route each year on the day of Mardi Gras, which would often pass this street intersection. "Go to the Mardi Gras," along with a later record "Big Chief," released in 1964, has become an iconic standard of the Carnival season.

== Release ==
The song was first released as Mardi Gras in New Orleans by Professor Longhair and His Shuffling Hungarians in 1949 on a Star Talent 10" 78 RPM single. A version recorded in November 1949 and produced by Ahmet Ertugun and Herb Abramson was released as a 10" by Professor Longhair and his New Orleans Boys on Atlantic in February 1950. A third (but earlier) 1949 recording of the song has also been released.

In 1959, Byrd re-recorded the song as Go to the Mardi Gras, which was produced by Joe Ruffino and released in December as a 7" and 10" on Ruffino's label, Ron Records. It featured Mac Rebennack on guitar, long before he became known as Dr. John.

The song was also re-recorded in 1971 and released in 1991 on the album Mardi Gras in Baton Rouge. Another version was recorded in 1974 and included on the remixed 1985 version of his Rock 'n' Roll Gumbo album.

Numerous live recordings of the song have also been released.

The song also appeared on numerous compilation albums, including The Devil's Music - Keith Richards' personal compilation of Blues, Soul and R&B Classics.

== Discography ==
- 1949 "Mardi Gras in New Orleans" b/w "Professor Longhair's Boogie" (Star Talent 808) 10"
- 02-1950 "Mardi Gras in New Orleans" b/w "She Walks Right In" (Atlantic 879) 10"
- 12-1959 "Go to the Mardi Gras" b/w "Everyday Everynight" (Ron 329) 7"/10"
- 1985 "Rock 'n' Roll Gumbo" (Dancing Cat Records) lp/cd
- 1991 "Mardi Gras in Baton Rouge" (Rhino Records/Bearsville) cd
