= Piety Street =

Studio album by John Scofield
- Released: March 9, 2009
- Studio: Piety Street Studios, (New Orleans, Louisiana); Avatar, New York City, New York
- Genre: Jazz
- Length: 62:06
- Label: Universal Classics
- Producer: Mark Bingham; John Scofield

John Scofield chronology
This Meets That (2007)	Piety Street (2009)	54 (2010)

Professional ratings
Review scores
Source	Rating
Allmusic	3.5/5 stars
All About Jazz	(favorable)
All About Jazz	(favorable)

Piety Street is a 2009 studio album by jazz guitarist John Scofield. It was recorded in New Orleans with Meters bassist George Porter Jr. and keyboardist/vocalist Jon Cleary. The album features gospel music with Cleary singing most of the songs. John Boutte is the guest vocalist on three tracks.

== Track listing ==
1. "That's Enough" (Dorothy Love Coates) - 3:45
2. "Motherless Child" - 5:24
3. "It's a Big Army" (John Scofield) - 5:31
4. "His Eye is on the Sparrow" (Charles H. Gabriel, Civilla D. Martin) - 4:15
5. "Something's Got a Hold on Me" (James Cleveland) - 4:47
6. "The Old Ship of Zion" (Thomas A. Dorsey) - 4:26
7. "Ninety Nine and a Half" (Coates) - 4:08
8. "Just a Little While to Stay Here" (Eugene Monroe Bartlett) - 5:59
9. "Never Turn Back" (Dorsey) - 4:51
10. "Walk With Me" - 5:11
11. "But I Like the Message" (Scofield) - 3:29
12. "The Angel of Death" (Hank Williams) - 6:42
13. "I'll Fly Away" (Albert E. Brumley) - 3:44

== Personnel ==
- John Scofield – guitars, handclaps, backing vocals
- Jon Cleary – acoustic piano, organ, handclaps, backing vocals, lead vocals (1–4, 7, 8, 10–13), rhythm guitar (13)
- George Porter Jr. – bass guitar, handclaps, backing vocals
- Ricky Fataar – drums (1–9, 11–13), handclaps, backing vocals
- Shannon Powell – tambourine, drums (10)
- Mark Bingham – handclaps, backing vocals
- John Boutté – handclaps, backing vocals, lead vocals (5, 6, 9)

=== Production ===
- Susan Scofield – executive producer, production coordinator, cover concept
- Mark Bingham – producer
- John Scofield – producer, arrangements, liner notes
- James Farber – recording, mixing
- Wesley Fontenot – assistant engineer
- Rick Kwan – assistant engineer
- Brian Montgomery – digital editing
- Greg Calbi – mastering at Sterling Sound (New York, NY)
- Shawn Hall – production coordinator
- Paul Siegel – music consultant
- HessDesignWorks.com – art direction, illustration
- Mark Hess – cover photo illustration
- Nick Suttle – cover photography
- Ricky Fataar – session photography
