= Alfred "Uganda" Roberts =

American musician (1943–2020)

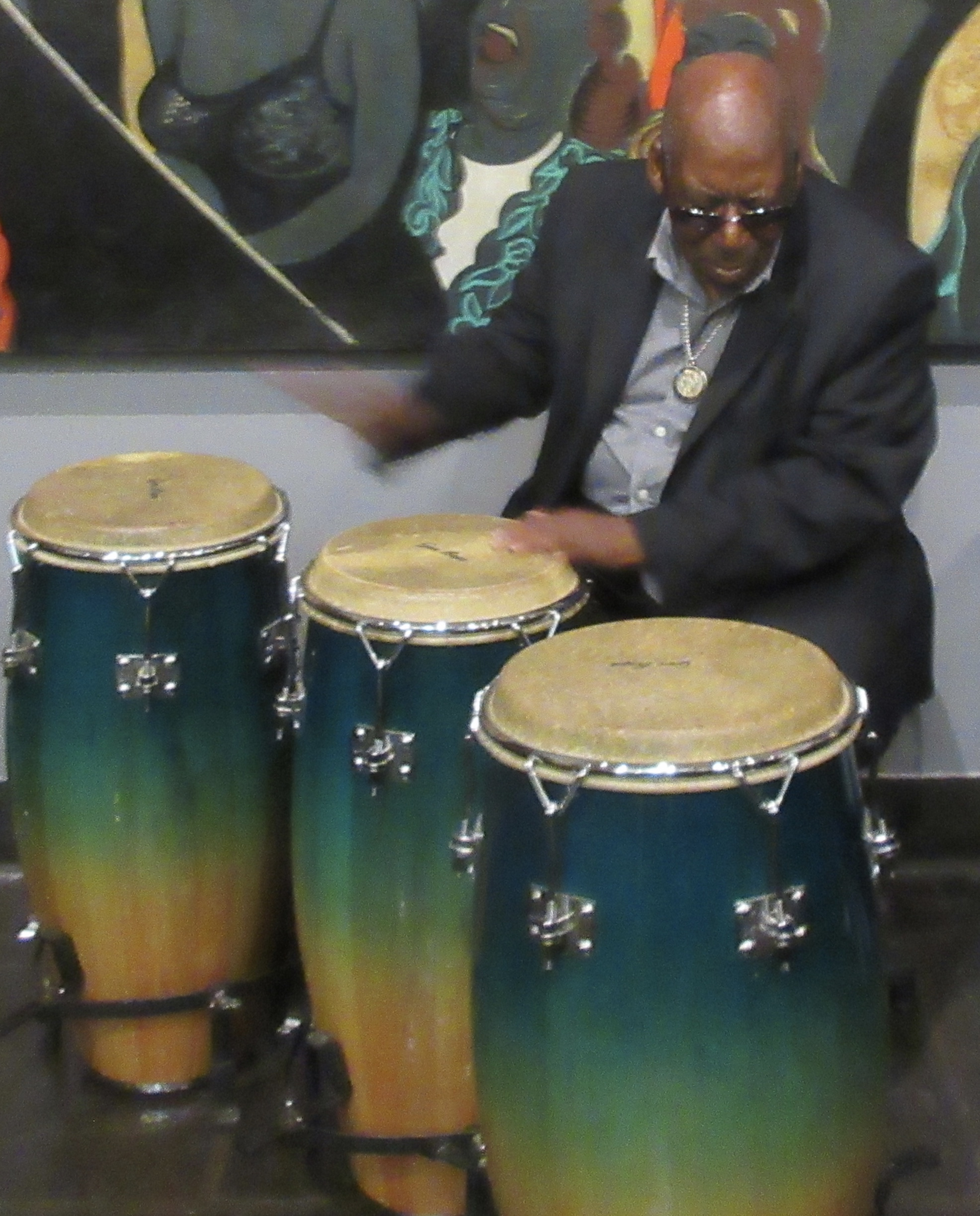
- Roberts in 2018

Background information
- Also known as: 'Uganda'
- Born: Alfred Roberts, Jr. April 8, 1943; New Orleans, Louisiana, United States
- Died: May 5, 2020 (aged 77)
- Genres: Afro-Calypso
- Instrument: Congas/Percussion

Alfred "Uganda" Roberts (April 8, 1943 – May 5, 2020) was an American conga/percussion player.

As a young musician he performed with Professor Longhair, who he would continue to work with until Longhair's death, one of the many New Orleans notables Roberts performed with.

== History ==
Born and raised in the historic Tremé neighborhood of New Orleans, Roberts took an interest in calypso rhythms from a young age, being introduced to the music by attending clubs frequented by the many sailors and seamen who sailed back and forth between New Orleans and the Caribbean.

Beginning his career in music in his early teens, playing bongos in clubs in the French Quarter, Roberts switched to the congas in his early 20s with the encouragement of jazz drummer, Smokey Johnson. After becoming an in-demand conga/percussion player in New Orleans, Roberts established a relationship with fellow Treme resident and neighbor, record producer Allen Toussaint, leading to Roberts becoming a house percussionist in Toussaint's Sea Saint Studios, playing on recordings such as The Meters' Afrika and Hey Pocky Way, as well as Toussaint's 1972 album, Life, Love, and Faith.

In 1972, Roberts was introduced to New Orleans pianist Henry Roland Byrd, better known to the public as Professor Longhair. It was at the 2nd annual New Orleans Jazz and Heritage Festival that Jazz Fest producer/founder Quint Davis introduced the two musicians, and Roberts would go on to tour and record with Professor Longhair for eight years, until Professor Longhair's death in 1980. Roberts is featured on Professor Longhair's Rock N Roll Gumbo (1974), featuring Louisiana blues musicians Snooks Eaglin and Clarence “Gatemouth” Brown, as well as his last studio album ever recorded, Crawfish Fiesta (1980). The London Concert (recorded 1978, released 1994) is a duo performance by Professor Longhair and Roberts.

Roberts toured with Willie Tee and the Wild Magnolias off and on from 1980 until 1986, when he took a hiatus from the music industry, occasionally coming out of his semi-retirement to tour and record - such as on Dr. John’s albums Goin' Back to New Orleans (1992) and Dis, Dat, or D’udda (2004). He also recorded commercially with Irma Thomas and John Mooney.

One evening in 2007, Roberts was invited by the young funk band Groovesect to join them on stage at New Orleans' Maple Leaf Bar, starting a relationship that would result in Roberts joining the band and recording on Groovesect's debut album, On The Brim.

He performed at The Bloomington Blues & Boogie Woogie Piano Festival, in Bloomington, Indiana, in 2017 and 2018.

Uganda Roberts performed as himself on the television series Treme.
