= Quint Davis =

American festival producer and director

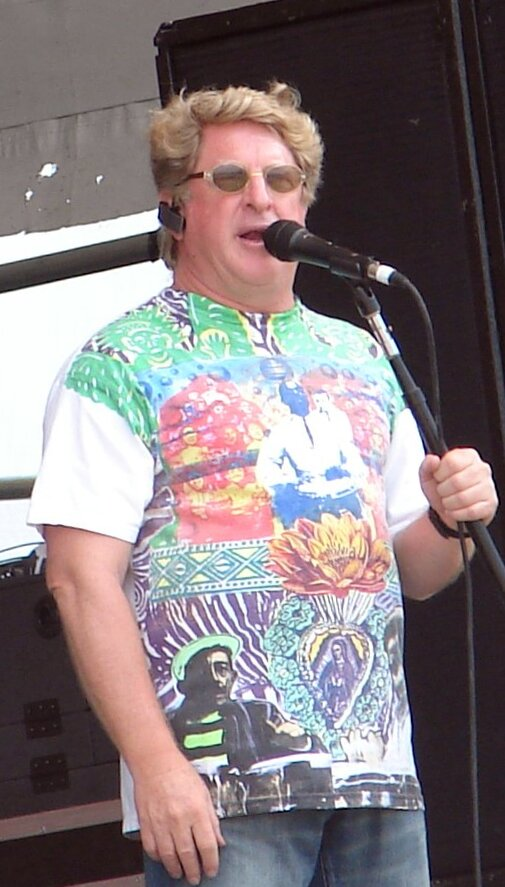
- Davis in 2008

Background information
- Born: Arthur Quentin Davis, Jr. November 5, 1947 (age 78); New Orleans, Louisiana, U.S.
- Occupations: Festival producer, music producer, manager
- Years active: 1970 - present
- Website: Festival Productions Inc. - New Orleans

Quint Davis (born November 5, 1947) is an American festival producer and director based in New Orleans. He is best known as the producer of the New Orleans Jazz & Heritage Festival (Jazz Fest) founded by George Wein. Davis has been involved in the production of the event since its start in 1970. He is the CEO of Festival Productions, Inc. - New Orleans, the company that produces the Jazz Fest.

== Biography ==
Davis was born Arthur Quentin Davis Jr. in New Orleans, Louisiana, United States. He was the first of three children of the family. His father, Arthur Quentin Davis, was an architect whose firm designed notable buildings such as the Louisiana Superdome and the New Orleans Arena.

Davis majored in drama and ethnomusicology at Tulane University. While still in college, Davis met Wein who was looking for local co-workers to produce the Jazz Fest. He dropped out of college to be involved in the Festival production with Wein.

The first Festival took place at the Congo Square in Louis Armstrong Park. Davis also became a manager of Professor Longhair and road manager for Duke Ellington, McCoy Tyner and B.B. King.

In 1989, Professor Longhair's album Houseparty New Orleans Style, which was produced by Davis, won the Best Traditional Blues Recording category of the Grammy Awards.

In 1993, Davis produced America's Reunion on the Mall, a festival organized as a part of President Bill Clinton's inaugural events.

As of 2014, Davis still plays the leading role in producing the Jazz Fest. He also acts as the spokesperson of the event and emcees at the Festival. Davis has said of his philosophy behind selecting the Jazz Fest lineup, "Our bottom line is...musicianship. Whatever you do, you have to be great."

Apart from the Jazz Fest, Davis is also engaged in the production of Essence Music Festival, another big music event in New Orleans.

Davis appears on stage in the role of MC for the concert portions of the 2005 documentary film Make It Funky!, which presents a history of New Orleans music and its influence on rhythm and blues, rock and roll, funk and jazz.
