= Live on the Queen Mary =

Live album by Professor Longhair
- Released: 1978
- Recorded: March 24, 1975
- Genre: New Orleans rhythm and blues
- Label: Harvest
- Producer: Tom Wilson

Professor Longhair chronology
| Rock 'n' Roll Gumbo (1974) | Live on the Queen Mary (1978) | Crawfish Fiesta (1980) |

Live on the Queen Mary is an album by the American musician Professor Longhair, released in 1978. He was allegedly upset about its release, as he claimed not to know that his performance was recorded.

The album is a favorite of Hugh Laurie, who, in tribute, filmed a special, Live on the Queen Mary, to promote his album Didn't It Rain.

== Production ==
The album was produced by Tom Wilson. It was recorded during a 1975 party aboard the RMS Queen Mary, hosted by Paul McCartney to mark the end of the recording sessions for Venus and Mars. "Stagger Lee" is a version of the Lloyd Price song. "I'm Movin' On" is a cover of the Hank Snow tune. "Cry to Me" is a version of the song made famous by Solomon Burke. "Gone So Long" and "Mess Around" are performed as instrumentals. The liner notes are by John Broven, taken from his book Walking to New Orleans.

== Critical reception ==
Professional ratings
Review scores
| Source | Rating |
|---|---|
| AllMusic | 4.5/5 stars |
| Robert Christgau | A− |
| The Minneapolis Star | 3.5/4 stars |
| MusicHound Blues: The Essential Album Guide | 4/5 stars |
| Omaha World-Herald | 4/5 stars |
| The Rolling Stone Album Guide | 3/5 stars |
| The Virgin Encyclopedia of R&B and Soul | 3/5 stars |

The Globe and Mail wrote that Professor Longhair "gives an outstanding piano performance (about the only sound that comes through clearly) and a vocal show which hints that on a better day he could tear the joint down." In a subsequent article, the paper opined that Professor Longhair's piano playing is "originality tantamount to the first time Lester Young or Charlie Parker did the first funny thing on the saxophone." The Liverpool Daily Post noted Professor Longhair's "curious squeaky voice" and "rough-edged city blues." The Morning Call labeled Live on the Queen Mary "a minor classic."

Newsday praised his "unique syncopation and earthy vocals." The Daily Breeze called Professor Longhair "unquestionably one of the greatest talents ever to play a piano." Robert Christgau praised the uncredited backing musicians. The Kansas City Times opined that Professor Longhair's "voice is surprisingly melodious." The New York Times deemed the album "rollicking, exuberant piano blues with an undercurrent of deep feeling."

== Track listing ==
| No. | Title | Length |
|---|---|---|
| 1. | "Tell Me Pretty Baby" |
| 2. | "Mess Around" |
| 3. | "Everyday I Have the Blues" |
| 4. | "Tipitina" |
| 5. | "I'm Movin' On" |
| 6. | "Mardi Gras in New Orleans" |
| 7. | "Cry to Me" |
| 8. | "Gone So Long" |
| 9. | "Stagger Lee" |
