= Jon Cleary (musician) =

British-born R&B and funk musician

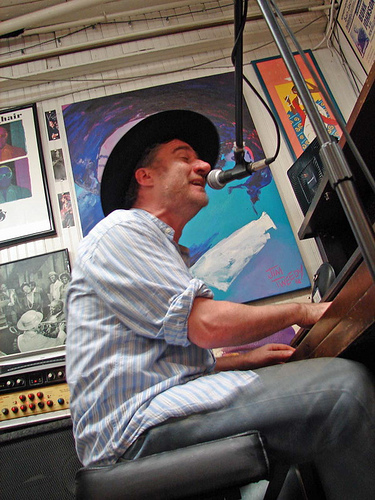
- Cleary in 2008

Background information
- Born: August 11, 1962 (age 63); Cranbrook, Kent, England
- Genres: Funk, R&B, soul
- Occupation: Musician
- Instrument: Piano
- Years active: 1980–present
- Labels: FHQ, Single Lock, Basin Street, Virgin/Point Blank, Ace, Well Kept Secret
- Website: joncleary.com

Jon Cleary (born August 11, 1962) is a British-born, American funk and R&B musician, based in New Orleans, Louisiana. Cleary is an accomplished pianist as well as being a multi-instrumentalist, vocalist and songwriter.

Cleary has performed with a number of prolific musicians including Eric Clapton, Bonnie Raitt (whom Cleary has also opened for), Taj Mahal, B.B. King, Ryan Adams, and Eric Burdon. Compositions by Cleary have been recorded by such notable musicians as Taj Mahal, Bonnie Raitt, and John Scofield on his 2009 album Piety Street.

Cleary's current band is Jon Cleary & The Absolute Monster Gentlemen, who have released six albums. Their album Go Go Juice won the Grammy Award for Best Regional Roots Music Album in the 58th Annual Grammy Awards.

== Early life ==
Cleary is originally from Cranbrook, Kent, in the south-east of England. He attended Colliers Green Primary School, Angley Secondary and then Cranbrook School. His father played guitar but it was his uncle, returning from trips to America bringing recordings of Professor Longhair and others, who inspired his love for R&B. Cleary's focus was always more on art and music and everything that goes with it, than academic pursuits, and he soon left schooling behind to develop a life in music.

== Career ==
=== Jon Cleary & The Absolute Monster Gentlemen ===
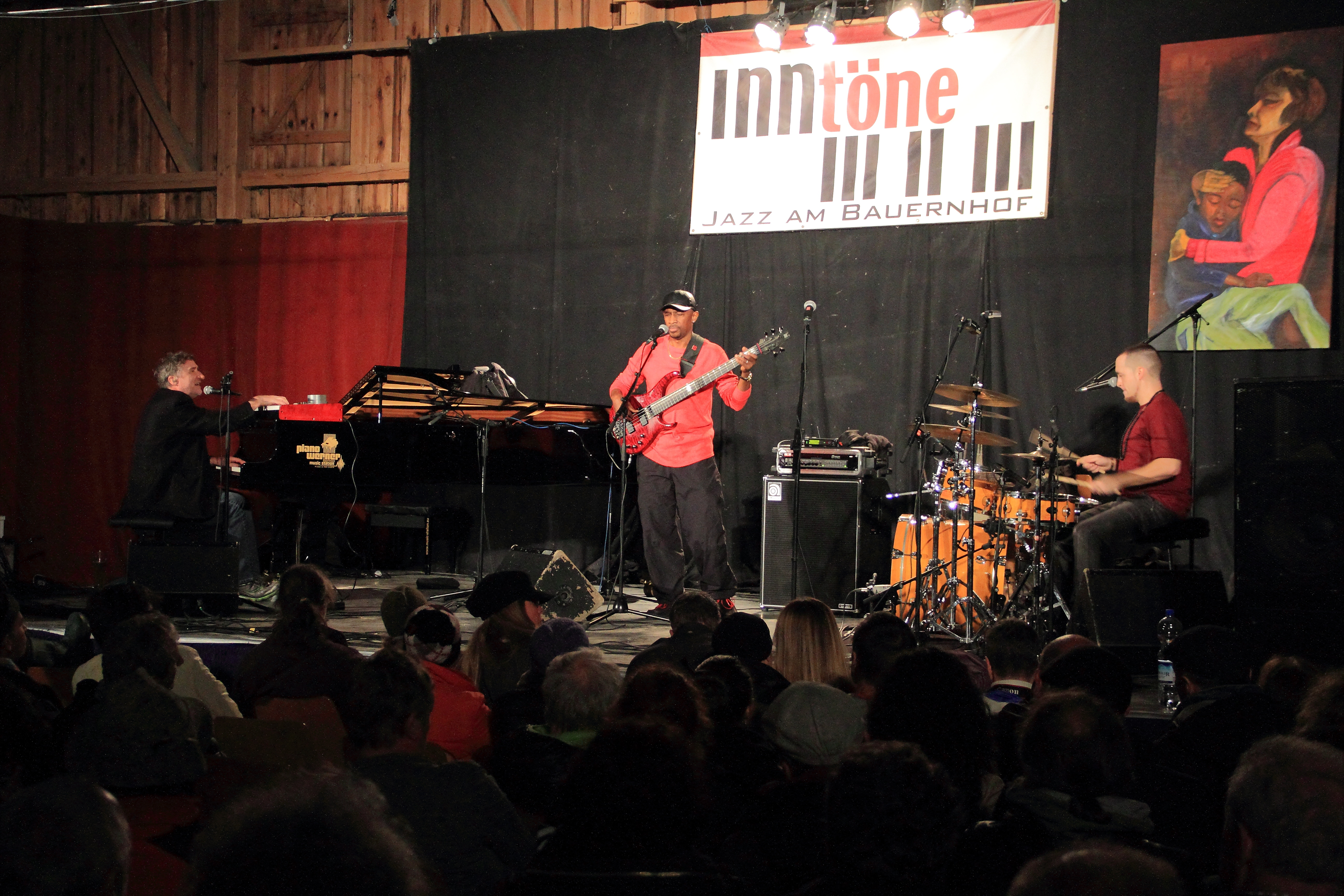
Jon Cleary, Cornell Williams (b) & A.J. Hall (dr) at INNtöne Jazzfestival, Austria 2016

Jon Cleary & the Absolute Monster Gentlemen consist of Cleary on keyboard and vocals, Cornell C. Williams on bass and backup vocals, and Thomas Glass on drums. All of the band members, except for Cleary, were born in New Orleans. The Absolute Monster Gentlemen can swell to an 8-piece band, often including musicians like Nigel Hall on keyboards, Pedro Segundo on percussion, Xavier Lynn on guitar, and the Absolute Monster Horns.

The band tours worldwide and regularly performs at classic New Orleans venues like Tipitina's and the Maple Leaf Bar. They are also a mainstay at the annual Jazz and Heritage Festival and have played at Bonnaroo as well as other music festivals. Rolling Stone's David Fricke wrote of the Pin Your Spin album: "Cleary can be an absolute monster on his own, but Cleary's full combo R&B is as broad, deep and roiling as the Mississippi river, the combined swinging product of local keyboard tradition, Cleary's vocal-songwriting flair for moody Seventies soul and the spunky-meters roll of his Gentlemen".

=== Other ===
Cleary is interviewed on screen and appears in performance footage in the 2005 documentary film Make It Funky!, which presents a history of New Orleans music and its influence on rhythm and blues, rock and roll, funk and jazz. In the film, Cleary performs a piano duo of "Tipitina" with Allen Toussaint.

Cleary played piano on Annika Chambers' 2016 album, Wild & Free.

Cleary was featured frequently on HBO's Treme.

== Discography ==
Albums

- Alligator Lips & Dirty Rice (Ace, 1994)
- Moonburn (Virgin/Poinblank, 1999)
- Jon Cleary & the Absolute Monster Gentlemen (Basin Street, 2002)
- Pin Your Spin (Basin Street, 2004)
- Do Not Disturb (EP) (FHQ, 2007)
- Mo Hippa (FHQ, 2008)
- Occapella (FHQ, 2012)
- Go Go Juice (FHQ, 2015)
- Dyna-Mite (FHQ, 2018)
- So Swell (Single Lock, 2023)
- The Bywater Sessions (FHQ/Well Kept Secret, 2025)

Appearances

- Goin' Home: A Tribute to Fats Domino - with Bonnie Raitt - Track 10 "I'm in Love Again/All by Myself" (Vanguard, 2007)
- Piety Street - by John Scofield (EmArcy, 2009)
- Plays Well with Others - by Greg Koch - Track 3 "Walk Before You can Crawl" (Rhymes With Chalk Music, 2013)
