= Come On (Earl King song) =

Song written by Earl King

"Come On – Part I"

Single by Earl King
- B-side: "Come On – Part II"
- Released: 1960
- Recorded: October 27, 1960
- Genre: Rhythm and blues
- Length: 2:30
- Label: Imperial
- Songwriter: Earl King
- Producer: Dave Bartholomew

Earl King singles chronology
"The Things That I Used to Do" (1960)	"Come On – Part I" (1960)	"You're More to Me Than Gold" (1960)

"Come On" (often referred to as "Let the Good Times Roll") is a song written by New Orleans rhythm and blues artist Earl King. He first recorded the song as "Darling Honey Angel Child" in 1960 for the Ace Records subsidiary Rex. Later that year, he recorded it as a two-part song for Imperial Records using some new lyrics. Retitled "Come On", it was released in 1960 with "Come On – Part I” as the A-side backed with “Come On – Part II” (Imperial 5713).

The song, instrumentally, is a showcase for guitar playing. Music writer John Perry compares it to Freddie King instrumentals, such as "Hide Away" and "The Stumble". He adds that it is performed in the "guitar-friendly key of E ... specifically designed to cram as many hot licks as possible into a single number".

"Come On" did not appear in Billboard magazine's R&B record chart, but gained a higher profile due to Jimi Hendrix. The song was one of the earliest songs played by Hendrix, starting with high school bands at the Spanish Castle music club south of Seattle. In 1968, he recorded "Come On" with the Jimi Hendrix Experience for their third album, Electric Ladyland. Hendrix follows King's rhythm guitar parts, but performs the song at a faster tempo, giving the song a more rock feel. Bassist Noel Redding and drummer Mitch Mitchell also provide a more driving rhythm, which adds emphasis during Hendrix's guitar solo. It was the last song recorded for Electric Ladyland. According to Redding, "that was done to fill out the album ... We just played it live and they took it".

In 1977, King re-recorded an updated version at Knight Studios in Metairie, Louisiana. Titled "Come On (Let the Good Times Roll)", it shows Hendrix's influence and was released by Sonet Records. Several other musicians have recorded renditions of the song, including Dr. John (as "Let the Good Times Roll" for Dr. John's Gumbo in 1972); Freddie King (Burglar, 1974); Anson Funderburgh and the Rockets (Talk To You By Hand, 1981); James Booker (as "Let the Good Times Roll" for Live from Belle Vue, 2015); Stevie Ray Vaughan (as "Come On (Part III)" for Soul to Soul, 1985); and the Steve Miller Band (Bingo!, 2010). Diesel recorded a version for his EP 7 Axes (2011). In 2013, Flo Rida included a part of the chorus, credited, in "Let it Roll", which also sampled Freddie King's 1974 recording.

The song is included as a full-length performance by Snooks Eaglin with guest George Porter Jr. and house band in the 2005 documentary film Make It Funky!, which presents a history of New Orleans music and its influence on rhythm and blues, rock and roll, funk and jazz.
