= New Orleans Piano =

Studio album by Professor Longhair
- Released: 1972
- Recorded: New Orleans, Louisiana, U.S. November 1949 and November 1953
- Genre: Blues
- Length: 36:27
- Label: Atlantic
- Producer: Ahmet Ertegün, Jerry Wexler (Tracks 1–5 of 1989 edition); Ahmet Ertegün, Herb Abramson (Tracks 6–16 of 1989 edition)

Professor Longhair chronology
New Orleans Piano (1972)	Mardi Gras in Baton Rouge (1991)

Professional ratings
Review scores
Source	Rating
AllMusic	4.5/5 stars
Christgau's Record Guide	B+
The Penguin Guide to Blues Recordings	4/4 stars

New Orleans Piano is a 1972 album by Professor Longhair. It consists of material recorded in 1949 and 1953, including tracks previously released by Atlantic Records.

The 1953 recording of "Tipitina" was added to the US National Recording Registry in 2011.

In 2003, the album was ranked number 220 on Rolling Stone magazine's list of the 500 greatest albums of all time, and 222 in a 2012 revised list.

== Track listing ==
All tracks are written by Roy Byrd (Professor Longhair).

Side one
No.	Title	Catalogue	Length
1.	"In the Night"	Atlantic 1020 (as Professor Longhair & His Blues Scholars)	2:33
2.	"Tipitina"	previously unissued take	2:39
3.	"Hey Now Baby"	previously unissued	2:56
4.	"Walk Your Blues Away"	Atlantic 906 (as Professor Longhair & His Blues Scholars)	2:56
5.	"Hey Little Girl"	Atlantic 947 (as Roland Byrd)	3:02
6.	"Willie Mae"	Atlantic 947 (as Roland Byrd)	2:48
7.	"Professor Longhair Blues"	Atlantic 906 (as Professor Longhair & His Blues Scholars)	2:31

Side two
No.	Title	Catalogue	Length
1.	"Ball the Wall"	previously unissued	3:21
2.	"Who's Been Fooling You"	previously unissued	2:10
3.	"Boogie Woogie"	previously unissued	2:41
4.	"Longhair's Blues-Rhumba"	previously unissued	3:14
5.	"Mardi Gras in New Orleans"	Atlantic 897 (as Roy "Baldhead" Byrd)	2:54
6.	"She Walks Right In"	Atlantic 897 (as Roy "Baldhead" Byrd)	2:49
Total length:			36:27

=== 1989 reissue ===
All tracks are written by Roy Byrd. Tracks 1–5 are recorded in New Orleans November 1953. Tracks 6–16 are recorded in New Orleans November 1949.

No.	Title	Catalogue	Length
1.	"In the Night"	Atlantic 1020	2:34
2.	"Tipitina" (Bonus Track)	Atlantic 1020	2:25
3.	"Tipitina"	Atlantic SD 7225	2:40
4.	"Ball the Wall"	Atlantic SD 7225	3:20
5.	"Who's Been Fooling You"	Atlantic SD 7225	2:12
6.	"Hey Now Baby"	Atlantic SD 7225	2:57
7.	"Mardi Gras in New Orleans" (Bonus Track)	previously unreleased	2:56
8.	"She Walks Right In" (Bonus Track)	previously unreleased	3:09
9.	"Hey Little Girl"	Atlantic 947	3:03
10.	"Willie Mae"	Atlantic 947	2:49
11.	"Walk Your Blues Away"	Atlantic 906	2:58
12.	"Professor Longhair Blues"	Atlantic 906	2:30
13.	"Boogie Woogie"	Atlantic SD 7225	2:42
14.	"Longhair's Blues-Rhumba"	Atlantic SD 7225	3:14
15.	"Mardi Gras in New Orleans"	Atlantic 897	2:54
16.	"She Walks Right In"	Atlantic 897	2:48
Total length:			45:04

== Personnel ==
=== 1953 session ===
- Roy Byrd – vocals, piano
- Lee Allen – tenor saxophone
- Red Tyler – baritone saxophone
- Edgar Blanchard – bass
- Earl Palmer – drums

=== 1949 session ===
- Roy Byrd – vocals, piano
- Robert Parker – alto saxophone
- Al Miller or John Woodrow – drums
- Unknown – bass
- Unknown (thought to be Charles Burbank (or Burbeck?) – tenor saxophone
