= Tipitina =

Single by Professor Longhair

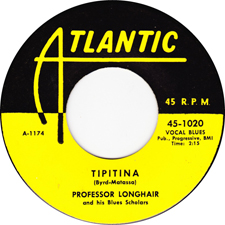

Single by Professor Longhair
- B-side: "In The Night"
- Released: 1953
- Recorded: 1953
- Genre: New Orleans blues
- Length: 2:15
- Label: Atlantic
- Songwriters: Roy Byrd; Cosimo Matassa

"Tipitina" is a song written and originally recorded by New Orleans pianist and singer Professor Longhair. His original version was recorded and released in 1953 by Atlantic Records. Although the nature of his contributions are unknown, recording engineer Cosimo Matassa is listed as the song's co-writer along with Roy Byrd, Professor Longhair's legal name.

The song has been widely covered and is considered a New Orleans music standard. The New Orleans music venue, Tipitina's, was named for the song, and Tipitina's Foundation bears the Tipitina name.

== Background ==
Pianist Henry Roeland "Roy" Byrd, known as Professor Longhair, was a prominent New Orleans musician. He played syncopated music that combined blues, ragtime, zydeco, rhumba, mambo and calypso. His singing was characterized as hoarse. His peripatetic recording career began in 1949 with "Mardi Gras In New Orleans" and "She's Got No Hair" with a group credited as "Longhair and his Shuffling Hungarians." A year later at Mercury Records and Roy Byrd & his Blues Jumpers rerecorded "She's Got No Hair" as "Bald Head", which broke through as his only national R&B hit. In 1953, at Atlantic Records, he recorded "Tipitina", which is now regarded as his "signature song".

== Details ==
The melody is derived from Champion Jack Dupree's 1941 recording of "Junker Blues", a song Dupree had learned from fellow New Orleans pianist Willie Hall. Rolling Stone described "Tipitina" as a "rhumba-style track" that has become a quintessential New Orleans standard. According to the Rock and Roll Hall of Fame, which inducted Longhair in 1992, "The hum-along nonsense syllables and stutter stepping left-hand rhythm of 'Tiptina' is both a symbol and staple of New Orleans music."

Allen Toussaint described learning the song as a "rite of passage".

Despite the song's popularity, the subject of "Tipitina" is unknown. Among the speculated subjects are a place and a person. According to an interview and a recording by Dr. John (Mac Rebennack) played at the WWOZ Piano Night concert in 2020, Tipitina was a type of - or name of - a bird. Rebennack said he had never heard of that before or since. Hugh Laurie, who released his version of the song in 2011, commented about its mystery: "I thought it was better not knowing. It adds to its mystique and its power to make me laugh and cry all in one go."

The song became a hit in New Orleans after its initial release, but was not as successful in the rest of the United States. The 1953 Professor Longhair version and the 1972 Dr. John version are both considered "Classic non Hot 100 songs".

== Critical response ==
In 2011, the song was included in the National Recording Registry because of its cultural significance. Byrd received a Grammy Hall of Fame Award for this song. The song was listed among the 500 Songs That Shaped Rock in 1994 by the Rock and Roll Hall of Fame. The song was also listed in the 1001 Songs: The Great Songs of All Time and the Artists, Stories and Secrets Behind Them (2006) by Toby Creswell as well as the Rock Song Index: The 7500 Most Important Songs for the Rock and Roll Era (2005) by Bruce Pollock.

The National Recording Registry announcement for this song said the song is "a signature distillation of the musical ideas and personality that inspired and influenced such New Orleans pianists as Fats Domino, Huey "Piano" Smith, James Booker, Dr. John and Allen Toussaint". According to Creswell, "Tipitina" "marshalled New Orleans rhythm into a sparkling package".

== Selected recorded versions ==
The song has been widely covered, as well as rerecorded multiple times by Professor Longhair himself.

• Professor Longhair: on New Orleans Piano (1972) – previously unreleased alternate take recorded in 1953.
• Dr. John: on Dr. John's Gumbo (1972)
• Professor Longhair: on Rock 'n' Roll Gumbo (1974). Following five vinyl reissues of the original LP from 1974 to 1980, this album was substantially remixed and remastered in 1985 for a reissue on LP, CD and cassette by George Winston's Dancing Cat Records. The 1985 remix of "Tipitina" is the version heard in the 1987 film The Big Easy and on its accompanying soundtrack album.
• Professor Longhair: on House Party New Orleans Style: The Lost Sessions 1971-1972 (1987) – previously unreleased 1972 version.
• James Booker: on Live from Belle Vue (2015).
• Hugh Laurie: on his debut album, Let Them Talk (2011).

=== Professor Longhair single version ===
The original Professor Longhair version was recorded in New Orleans in November 1953 under the name Professor Longhair & His Blues Scholars. According to John Crosby's Professor Longhair: A Bio-discography, performers included Roy Byrd (vocals, piano), Lee Allen (tenor saxophone), Frank Fields (bass), Earl Palmer (drums), and Alvin "Red" Tyler (baritone saxophone). However, the Atlantic Records Discography credits Edgar Blanchard as the bassist. It was released as a single in 1953. This version is included on several albums including the CD reissue of the 1972 album New Orleans Piano, which contains the single take released in 1953 as well as the alternate take first released on the 1972 vinyl LP. Other albums that include this version are Martin Scorsese Presents the Blues: Piano Blues (2003) and Doctors, Professors, Kings & Queens (2004).

== In popular culture ==
- A version by Bo Dollis & The Wild Magnolias is in the Bones season 1 episode "The Man in the Morgue" (an episode set in New Orleans).
- "Tipitina", the November 25, 2012 season 3 finale of Treme (a TV series about New Orleans in the aftermath of Hurricane Katrina), used the song twice.
- The song is included as a full-length performance (piano duo) by Allen Toussaint and Jon Cleary in the 2005 documentary film Make It Funky!, which presents a history of New Orleans music and its influence on rhythm and blues, rock and roll, funk and jazz.
