= Tuts Washington =

American blues pianist (1907–1984)

Background information
- Born: Isidore Washington; January 24, 1907; New Orleans, Louisiana, U.S.
- Died: August 5, 1984 (aged 77) New Orleans
- Genres: Blues, jazz, boogie-woogie
- Occupation: Musician
- Instrument: Piano
- Years active: 1920s–1984
- Labels: Imperial, Rounder, Night Train International Records, 504 Records

Isidore "Tuts" Washington (January 24, 1907 – August 5, 1984) was an American blues pianist from New Orleans, Louisiana, United States.

He taught himself to play the piano at age 10 and studied with the New Orleans jazz pianist Joseph Louis "Red" Cayou. In the 1920s and 1930s, he was a leading player for dance bands and Dixieland bands in New Orleans. His style blended elements of ragtime, jazz, blues, and boogie-woogie.

After World War II, Washington joined Smiley Lewis in a trio with drummer Herman Seals. They released several popular songs for Imperial, including "Tee-Nah-Nah", "The Bells Are Ringing", and "Dirty People". Washington moved to St. Louis to play with Tab Smith. He returned to New Orleans in the 1960s, performing in restaurants in the French Quarter, in clubs such as Tipitina's and at the New Orleans Jazz & Heritage Festival. For years he had a regular engagement playing piano at a bar in the Pontchartrain Hotel. He avoided recording for most of his career, but he released the solo piano album New Orleans Piano Professor for Rounder in 1983. A live recording by Washington, Live at Tipitina's '78, was released by Night Train International Records in 1998.

Washington is featured, along with Professor Longhair and Allen Toussaint, in the 1982 documentary film, Piano Players Rarely Ever Play Together.

Washington died on August 5, 1984, after having a heart attack while performing at the World's Fair in New Orleans.

== Discography ==
New Orleans Piano (with Lemon Nash, ukulele and vocal, incorrectly listed as Charles "Little Red" Lajoie, vocal and banjo)* - 504 Records – 504 CD 32

- "On the Sunny Side of the Street"
- "Muskrat Ramble"
- "Fast Blues #1"*
- "Blue Moon"
- "Basin Street Blues"
- "Some of These Days"*
- "Yancey Special #1"
- "After You've Gone"
- "Early One Morning"*
- "Cow Cow Blues"
- "Pinetop's Boogie"
- "Trouble Trouble"*
- "Tack Head Blues"
- "Yancey Special #2"
- "Indiana"*
- "St. Louis Blues"

Live At Tipitina's '78 - Night Train International – NTI CD 7101

- "Miss Lucy's Blues"
- "Honky Tonk"
- "Tuts Washington's Blues"
- "Intro & Stardust"
- "When the Saints Come Marching In"
- "Yancey Special"
- "Gravel Road Blues"
- "How High the Moon"
- "Corrine Corrina"
- "Flood Water Blues"
- "Tuts's Rag"
- "Blue Moon"
- "Someone to Watch Over Me"
- "Sweet Georgia Brown"
- "Pool Hall Blues"
- "Tuts's Tee Na Na"
- "Poydras Street"
- "Sweet Georgia Brown" - Reprise
- "After Hours"

Tuts Washington - New Orleans Piano Professor - Rounder Records – Rounder CD 11501

- "When the Saints Go Marching In"
- "Tin Roof Blues"
- "Arkansas Blues"
- "Do You Know What It Means to Miss New Orleans"
- "Honky Tonk"
- "Wolverine Blues"
- "On the Sunny Side of the Street"
- "Jambalaya"
- "Misty"
- "Mr. Freddie Blues"
- "Stardust"
- "Frankie and Johnny"
- "Hattie Rogers Blues"
- "Georgia on My Mind"
- "Tee Nah Nah"
- "White Christmas"
- "Forty-Four Blues"
- "Blue Moon"
- "Yancey Special"
- "Tipitina"
- "Cherry Pink & Apple Blossom White"
- "Santa Fe Blues"
- "Papa Yellow Blues"
