= Big Chief =

Song composed by Earl King

Single by Professor Longhair
- A-side: "Big Chief - Part 1"
- B-side: "Big Chief - Part 2"
- Released: February 1965
- Recorded: November, 1964; New Orleans, Louisiana
- Genre: R&B
- Length: 2:14
- Label: Watch Records 1900
- Songwriters: Ulis Gaines; Wardell Quezergue
- Producer: Joe Assunto

Professor Longhair singles chronology
"Bald Head" (1964)	"Big Chief" (1965)	"Willie The Prince" (1965)

Music video
- "Big Chief" on YouTube

"Big Chief" is a song recorded by Professor Longhair. It was released as a single by Watch Records of New Orleans in February, 1965. The song was written by Earl King though the single credits Ulis Gaines and Wardell Quezergue as the writers.

== Overview ==
The song features a whistled first chorus in a rollicking blues piano style and subsequent lyrics written in mock-American-Indian pidgin (whistled and sung by King, uncredited). The tune became popular in New Orleans, frequently performed by local musicians such as Dr. John, and is now a staple of the repertory of most brass bands and musicians in the area. (Even though it was not a national hit, the single was available for years in the New Orleans area, especially during Mardi Gras.)

King wrote the song while attending school, and recalled the tune during a recording session with Longhair arranged by Wardell Quezergue. Longhair originally wanted to record the song with a small ensemble, but Quezergue, King, and Smokey Johnson (who also played on the session) convinced him to include an eleven- or fifteen-piece horn ensemble on the 1964 recording.

== Background ==
The song refers to Mardi Gras Indian groups; an important part of the African American Mardi Gras tradition. The "Indian Nation" of Mardi Gras Indian "gangs" in New Orleans includes the Wild Magnolias, the Golden Eagles, and several others. Mardi Gras Indian gangs have existed since the early 20th Century. Each gang performs its own original songs and dances on Mardi Gras Day, on "Super Sunday" (the Sunday before St. Patrick's Day) and at other functions in the community. The "Big Chief", the "Spy Boy", the "Flag Boy" and several other roles or offices are important to the Mardi Gras Indian tradition of "masking" (parading through the street in full costume). These characters are mentioned in Earl King's song, as well as many other songs which have come out of New Orleans, such as "Jock-O-Mo" ("Iko Iko") or "My Indian Red".

According to tradition, the African Americans in New Orleans who first formed "Indian gangs" did so as a tribute to the Native American tribes in the area who took in runaway slaves in the pre–Civil War era. Mardi Gras Indians wear elaborate, hand made costumes which feature massive feather headdresses and intricate bead work.

== Personnel ==
According to "Blues Discography 1943 - 1970 Later Years (2nd Edition)", a 16-piece (including Fess himself) band including a 10-piece horn section participated in the recording session. It was Earl King the songwriter who took the lead vocals.。

- Professor Longhair - piano
- Earl King - vocals
- Clyde Kerr - trumpet
- Eddie Nash - trumpet
- Warren Bokes - trombone
- Wendell Eugene - trombone
- Waldron Joseph - trombone
- Warren Bell - alto saxophone
- Clarence Ford - alto saxophone
- Manuel Crusto - tenor saxophone
- Nat Perilliat - tenor saxophone
- Carl Bluin - baritone saxophone
- Mac Rebennack - guitar
- Curtis Mitchell - bass
- Smokey Johnson - drums
- Sydney Quezergue - percussion

== Cover versions ==
YEAR	ARTIST	ALBUM
1972	Dr. John	Dr. John's Gumbo
1979	Ronnie Barron	Blue Delicacies
1984	The Neville Brothers	Neville-ization
1989	Jon Cleary	Alligator Lips and Dirty Rice
1989	The Subdudes	The Subdudes
1990	The Wild Magnolias	I'm Back … At Carnival Time!
1991	Art Neville	Key To The Crescent City
1992	The Meters	The Meters Jam
2002	Dirty Dozen Brass Band	Medicated Magic

=== Sample ===
The song is sampled in the song "Knock 'Em Out" from Alright, Still, the debut album from Lily Allen.
