= Music of New Orleans =

Jazz music

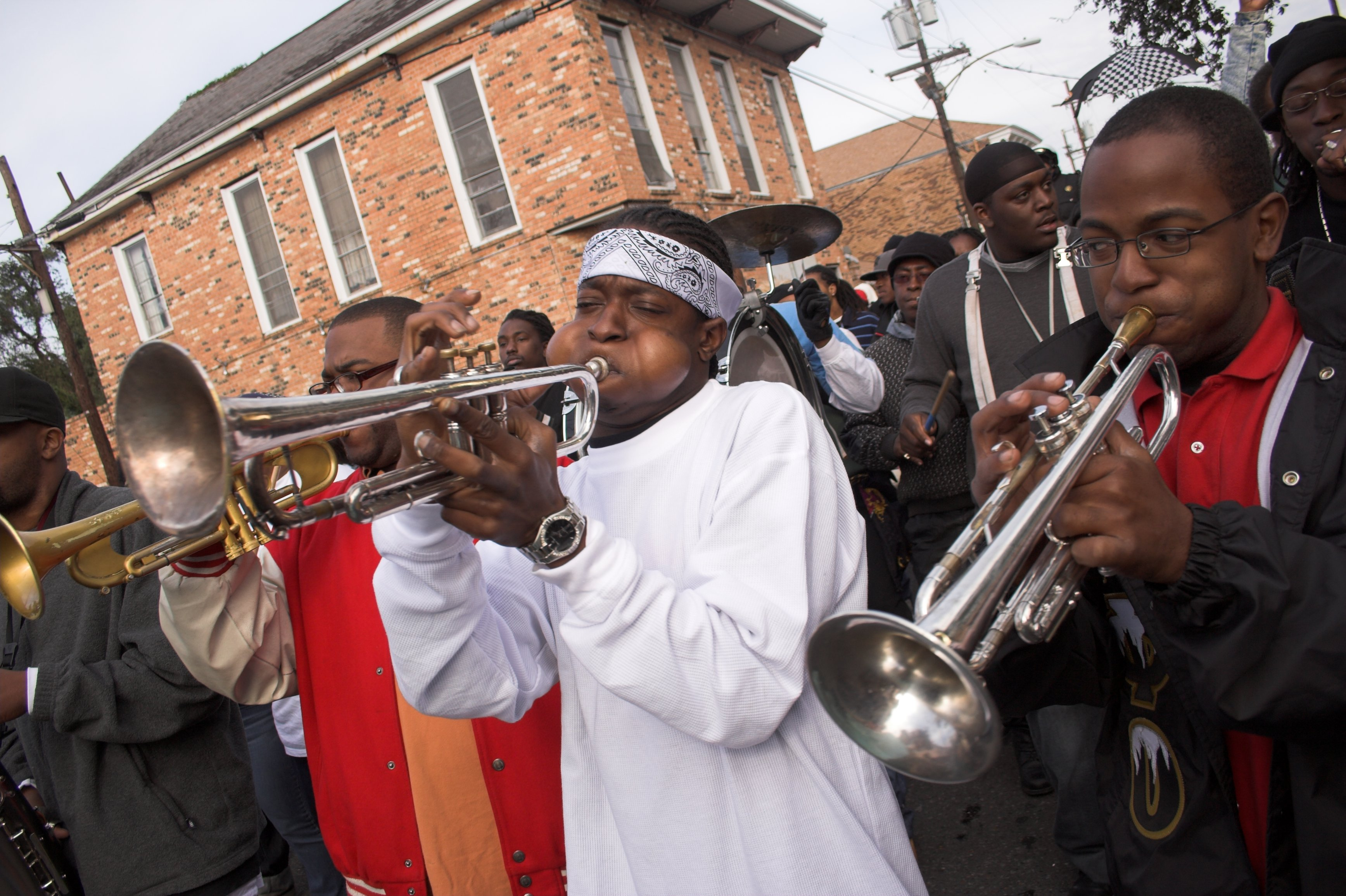
New Orleans brass band parade

The music of New Orleans assumes various styles of music which have often borrowed from earlier traditions. New Orleans is especially known for its strong association with jazz music, universally considered to be the birthplace of the genre. The earliest form was dixieland, which has sometimes been called traditional jazz, 'New Orleans', or 'New Orleans jazz'. However, the tradition of jazz in New Orleans has taken on various forms that have either branched out from original dixieland or taken entirely different paths altogether. New Orleans has also been a prominent center of funk, home to some of the earliest funk bands such as the Meters.

== Background ==
The African influence on New Orleans music can trace its roots at least back to Congo Square in New Orleans in 1835, when enslaved people would congregate there to play music and dance on Sundays. African music was primarily played as well as local music from varying sources such as adapted work songs, African American spirituals, and field hollers. African, Indigenous American, Cuban, and European musical forms that were popular in the city, including the evolving brass band tradition, provided the cultural mix which laid the groundwork for the New Orleans musical art forms to come.

By 1838, the local paper—the daily Picayune—ran a scathing article complaining about the emergence of brass bands in the city, which it stated could be found on every corner.

== Jazz ==
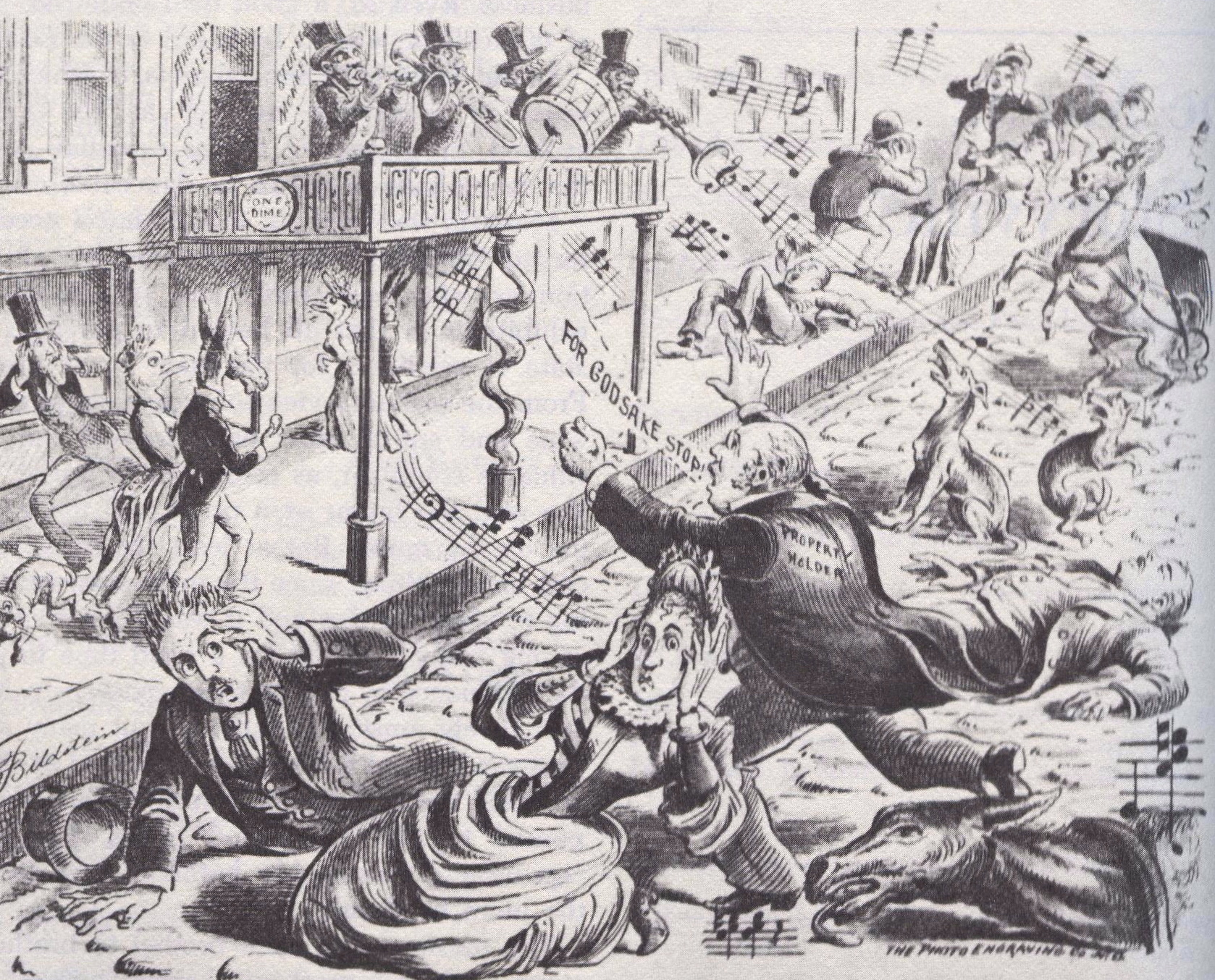
A caricature of an African-American band playing in New Orleans in 1890. New Orleans writer Al Rose has called this "The earliest known illustration of a jazz band". While the instrumentation of cornet or trumpet, trombone, clarinet, and drums is suggestive of the early jazz bands of some 15 years later, how close this music was to what would be known as "jazz" is speculative.

The term "jazz" (early on often spelled "jass") did not become popular until the mid and late 1910s, when New Orleans musicians first rose to prominence in other parts of the US and the New Orleans style needed a new name to differentiate it from the nationally popular ragtime. Before then, the New Orleans style was frequently simply called "ragtime" (Sidney Bechet continued to call his music "ragtime" throughout his life), along with such local terms as "hot music" and "ratty music".

The local New Orleans dance music style was already distinctive in the 19th century. When this style became what was later known as "jazz" remains a matter of debate and definition, although most New Orleans music historians believe what became known as New Orleans style jazz was the product of a series of developments, probably reaching its famous form no earlier than the 1890s and no later than the mid 1910s.

By the 1890s a man by the name of Poree hired a band led by cornetist Buddy Bolden, many of whose contemporaries as well as many jazz historians consider to be the first prominent jazz musician. The music was not called jazz at this time, consisting of marching band music with brass instruments and dancing. Many claim Bolden was the first player to play The Blues on a brass instrument. The actual term "jazz" was first "jass", the etymology of which is still not entirely clear. The connotation is sexual in nature, as many of the early performers played in rough working class venues. Despite colorful stories of mid-20th century writers, the prostitution district known as Storyville was no more important in the development of the music than the city's other neighborhoods, but did play a role in exposing some out of town visitors to the style. Many instruments used were often acquired second-hand at pawn shops, including used military band instruments.

The Creole people of New Orleans also contributed greatly to the evolution of the artform, though their own music became heavily influenced by the pioneering work of Bolden. New Orleans-born musicians such as Louis Armstrong, Sidney Bechet and Jelly Roll Morton all recalled the influence Bolden had on the direction of the music of New Orleans (Armstrong himself had no memory of Bolden, but was told about him by his mentor King Oliver) and jazz itself.

=== Sicilian influence ===
New Orleans had experienced a large wave of migration from the Italian region of Sicily between the late 1800s and early 1900s. The Sicilian capital of Palermo had long held cotton and citrus fruit trade with New Orleans. This resulted in the establishment of a direct shipping line between the two port cities which enabled a vast number of Sicilians to migrate to New Orleans, as well as other American cities. As a result of this migration, music of Sicily had some influence upon the development of New Orleans Jazz. This was shown in the New Orleans group the Original Dixieland Jass Band. Bandleader Nick LaRocca and drummer Tony Sbarbaro were both born to parents who were Sicilian migrants. The band's "Livery Stable Blues" became the first jazz record ever issued.

=== Latin American and Caribbean influences ===
Tresillo rhythm

Habanera rhythm

African American music began incorporating Contradanza (also called contradanza criolla, danza, danza criolla, or habanera) musical motifs in the nineteenth century, when the it gained international popularity. It is the Spanish and Spanish-American version of the contradanse and it was the first written music to be rhythmically based on an African rhythm pattern. From the perspective of African American music, the Contradanza rhythm (also known as congo, tango-congo, or tango) can be thought of as a combination of tresillo and the backbeat.

During the latter half of the 20th century, the term Latin jazz emerged as both a musical classification and a marketing label for jazz incorporating musical traditions from the Caribbean and Latin America. Although the term helped recognize these regions contributions to jazz, it also categorized their influence as a distinct subgenre, potentially obscuring the interconnected cultural origins of the music. Caribbean, Latin American, and jazz traditions have shared a long history of interaction, mutual influence, and cultural exchange, with each contributing significantly to the other's development. New Orleans, shaped by its distinctive multicultural environment and historical connections to the Caribbean and Latin America, became a major center for these musical exchanges from the earliest days of jazz.

Caribbean and Latin American musical traditions influenced the repertoire, rhythmic structures, and performance practices of early jazz. Many musicians recognized these connections as fundamental to the music rather than viewing them as influences from entirely separate traditions. The American jazz pianist and composer Jelly Roll Morton famously emphasized this relationship, stating, “If you can’t manage to put tinges of Spanish in your tunes, you will never be able to get the right seasoning, I call it, for jazz.” In this context, Morton’s use of the term “Spanish” referred to musical influences associated with Spanish-speaking regions of the Caribbean and Latin America. His concept of the “Spanish tinge” acknowledged the importance of these musical traditions in shaping jazz and reflected its development as a creolized musical expression connecting the African American and African-descended cultures of the Caribbean and the wider Americas.

Morton was not the first musician to recognize this influence. In 1898, African American composer Benjamin Harney published Ben Harney’s Rag Time Instructor, in which he attributed the origins of ragtime rhythms to Spanish music, particularly traditions associated with Mexico, including the Contradanza, danza, and seguidilla. Similarly, in 1938, American jazz composer and bandleader Duke Ellington observed that musicians incorporated Spanish syncopations into their rhythmic blues traditions. These statements illustrate the longstanding recognition among influential American musicians that Caribbean and Latin American rhythms were integral to the development of jazz and related African American musical forms.

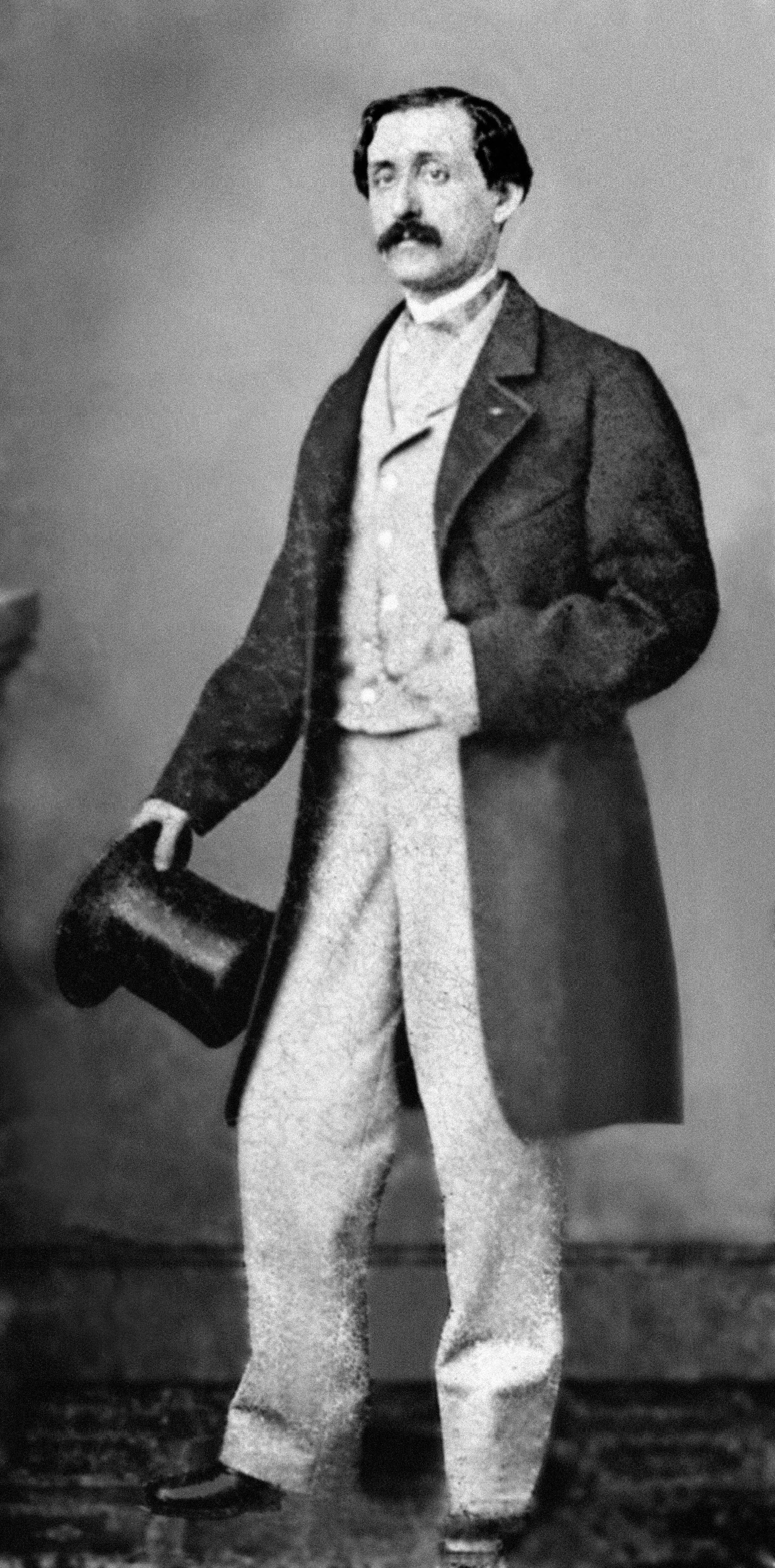
Louis Moreau Gottschalk, c. 1855–1865

Musicians from Havana and New Orleans would take the twice-daily ferry between both cities to perform and unsurprisingly, the habanera quickly took root in the musically fertile Crescent City. John Storm Roberts states that the musical genre habanera, "reached the U.S. 20 years before the first rag was published" (1999: 12). The symphonic work La nuit des tropiques (lit. "Night of the Tropics") by New Orleans native Louis Moreau Gottschalk, was influenced by the composer's studies in Cuba. Gottschalk used the tresillo variant cinquillo extensively. With Gottschalk, we see the beginning of serious treatment of Afro-Caribbean rhythmic elements in New World art music. For the more than quarter-century in which the cakewalk, ragtime, and proto-jazz were forming and developing, the habanera was a consistent part of African American popular music. It is reasonable to assume that tresillo-based rhythms were performed in Congo Square by Caribbean slaves. There are examples of tresillo-like rhythms in a few African American folk musics such as the foot stomping patterns in ring shout and the post-Civil War drum and fife music. Tresillo is also heard prominently in New Orleans second line music.

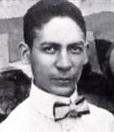
Jelly Roll Morton in 1917–1918

Early New Orleans jazz bands had Contradanza in their repertoire and the tresillo/habanera figure was a rhythmic staple of jazz at the turn of the 20th century. Comparing the music of New Orleans with the music of Cuba, Wynton Marsalis observes that tresillo is the New Orleans "clave". Although technically, the pattern is only half a clave, Marsalis makes the important point that the single-celled figure is the guide-pattern of New Orleans music. The Contradanza rhythm and tresillo can be heard in his left hand on songs like "The Crave" (1910, recorded 1938). Morton stated, "Now in one of my earliest tunes, "New Orleans Blues", you can notice the Spanish tinge.

Although the exact origins of jazz syncopation may never be known, there's evidence that the habanera/tresillo rhythm was there at its conception. Buddy Bolden, the first known jazz musician, is credited with creating the big four, the first syncopated bass drum pattern to deviate from the standard on-the-beat march. As the example below shows, the second half of the big four pattern is the habanera rhythm.

In Early Jazz; Its Roots and Musical Development, Gunther Schuller states:

It is probably safe to say that by and large the simpler African rhythmic patterns survived in jazz ... because they could be adapted more readily to European rhythmic conceptions. Some survived, others were discarded as the Europeanization progressed. It may also account for the fact that patterns such as [tresillo have] ... remained one of the most useful and common syncopated patterns in jazz/

=== Second line ===
In the very early days of brass bands, in the 'nineties and even before, the music was mostly written–I mean in the kind of band my father played in. As time went on, there was more improvising.

— Edmond Hall

The use of brass marching bands came long before jazz music through their use in the military, though in New Orleans many of the best-known musicians had their start in brass marching bands performing dirges as well as celebratory and upbeat tunes for New Orleans jazz funeral processions from the 1890s onward. The tradition drove onward with musicians such as Louis Armstrong, Henry "Red" Allen and King Oliver. The presence of marching bands lives on today in New Orleans, with musicians such as the Marsalis family doing some of their earliest work in such bands.

Much of New Orleans music today owes its debt to the early marching bands, even those marching bands which predate the birth of jazz music. In the late 19th century marching bands would often march through the streets of the city in second line parades. Some of the earliest bands originated from the Treme and Algiers neighborhoods, and the city gave birth to such bands as the Excelsior, Algiers Brass Band, Onward and Olympia brass bands. The Onward and Olympia bands each have sustained incarnations that continue performing to this day. Modern examples of the brass band tradition can be heard in the playing of groups like the Dirty Dozen Brass Band, or the Rebirth Brass Band founded by Phillip "Tuba Phil" Frazier, Keith Frazier, and Kermit Ruffins.

The history of the marching band in New Orleans is a rich one, with the various bands performing at virtually every major social event the city has to offer. They perform at funerals, picnics, carnivals and parades. The relationship between jazz bands and brass bands is one of co-influence. Jazz bands of this era began to go beyond the confines of the 6/8 time signature the marching bands utilized. Instead, New Orleans jazz bands began incorporating a style known as "ragging"; this technique implemented the influence of ragtime 2/4 meter and eventually led to improvisation. In turn, the early jazz bands of New Orleans influenced the playing of the marching bands, who in turn began to improvise themselves more often. Again, yet another indication that jazz music is symbolic of freedom.

=== Dixieland ===
You must understand that there was always a bad feeling between the northern part of the country and the southern part. After the Civil War they still battle against each other, and to those boys everything was Dixie and Dixieland as far as they were concerned. But to tell the facts, as far as we blacks were concerned it was New Orleans music — New Orleans, not Dixieland Jazz. Those boys, they made that up.

— Paul Barnes referring to the Original Dixieland Band.

The term dixieland was first coined by Dan Emmett in his song "Dixie's Land" in 1859. It was not a positive term for African Americans, as its usage defined any area of the south where slaves had not yet received emancipation. Dixieland music can be defined in a number of ways, though its origin is to be found in New Orleans, present first in the music of King Oliver. It quickly spread north and became popularized along with the migration of southern blacks to areas like Chicago. Today the term is used in reference to the music, which provides a general description of any form of jazz that is derived from early New Orleans jazz.

The term dixieland is generally not used very much by New Orleans–based musicians, for there is good evidence that the term was imposed on them. For instance, the first band to actually use the term in reference to the music in their name was the all-white Original Dixieland Band. This band played no small role in the coinage of the term dixieland in reference to jazz in New Orleans, though they were not the innovators of the music. The only true barrier this band broke was being the first to record New Orleans music, which happened in New York City of all places in 1917. Despite the criticism Paul Barnes made about them, he also said that they had a "first class band".

An early student of Dixieland was the young Louis Prima, as well as his older brother Leon, both of whom lived outside the French Quarter in a working-class neighborhood populated by Italian-American and African-American musicians. Into his early 20s, Louis Prima performed on trumpet and cornet throughout New Orleans before following in the path of his idol Armstrong, and moving North for career reasons, where he appeared at the Famous Door in New York City, eventually relocating to Las Vegas where, beginning in the mid-1950s, he regularly appeared with another New Orleans musician, saxophonist Sam Butera.

== Rhythm & blues and rock & roll ==
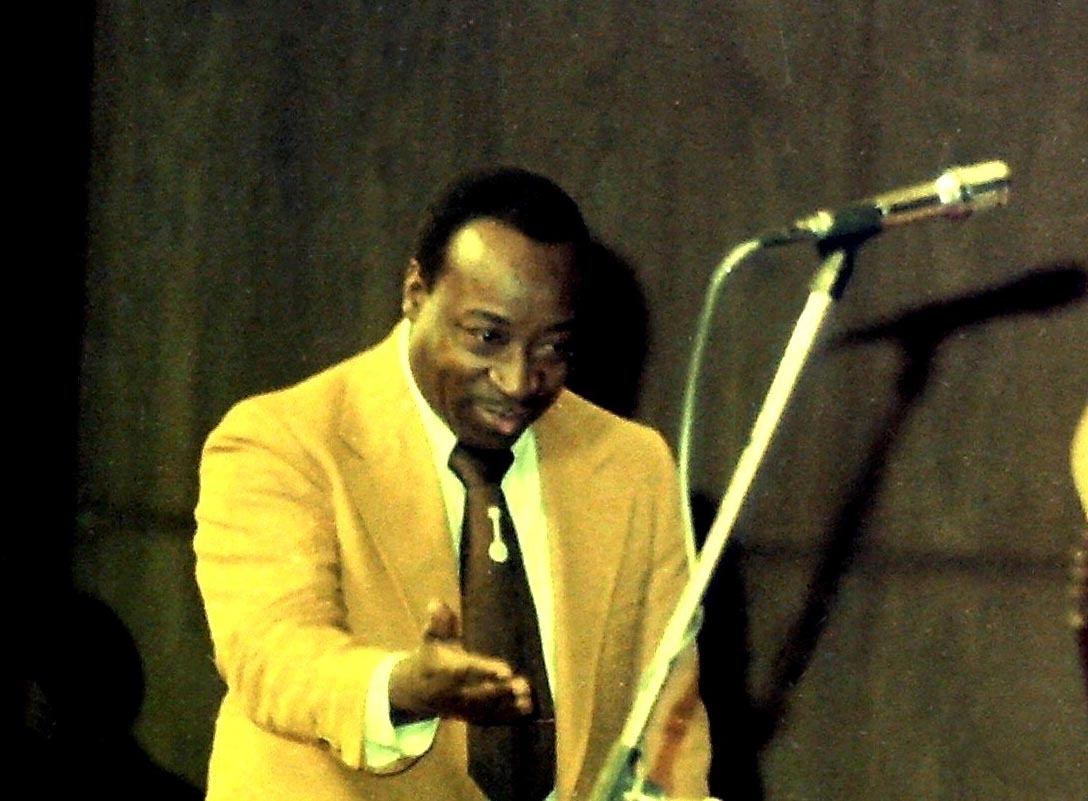
Dave Bartholomew in 1977

A new style came out of New Orleans after World War II. Prominent musicians such as Fats Domino helped shape what was first widely known as "Rhythm and Blues", which was an important ancestor of rock and roll, if not the first form of the music. In addition to the local talent, early rockers from elsewhere recorded many of their early hits in New Orleans using bands of New Orleans musicians.

In 1949, New Orleans jazz musician, and Fats Domino producer Dave Bartholomew brought the tresillo directly from Cuban music into early R&B.

New Orleans producer-bandleader Dave Bartholomew first employed this figure (as a saxophone-section riff) on his own 1949 disc "Country Boy" and subsequently helped make it the most over-used rhythmic pattern in 1950s rock 'n' roll. On numerous recordings by Fats Domino, Little Richard and others, Bartholomew assigned this repeating three-note pattern not just to the string bass, but also to electric guitars and even baritone sax, making for a very heavy bottom. He recalls first hearing the figure – as a bass pattern on a Cuban disc

— Palmer (1995).

In a 1988 interview with Robert Palmer, Bartholomew revealed how he initially superimposed tresillo over swing rhythm.

I heard the bass playing that part on a 'rumba' record. On "Country Boy" I had my bass and drums playing a straight swing rhythm and wrote out that rumba bass part for the saxes to play on top of the swing rhythm. Later, especially after rock 'n' roll came along, I made the 'rumba' bass part heavier and heavier. I'd have the string bass, an electric guitar and a baritone all in unison

— Palmer (1988).

Bartholomew referred to the Cuban son by the misnomer rumba, a common practice of that time. On Bartholomew's 1949 tresillo-based "Oh Cubanas" we clearly hear an attempt to blend African American and Afro-Cuban music.

== Hip-hop ==
Pivotal in the emergence of New Orleans into the mainstream hip hop community was the establishment of No Limit Records (now New No Limit Records) and Cash Money Records. These labels produced dozens of albums by young New Orleans rappers beginning in the mid-1990s. Some seminal New Orleans artists from No Limit included Mia X, Mystikal, Master P, Soulja Slim, C-Murder, and Silkk the Shocker. Cash Money likewise signed and released albums by several New Orleans artists including BG, Juvenile, Turk, Big Tymers, and Lil' Wayne. The city is also the birthplace of bounce music which is gaining popularity. Former Cash Money in-house producer Mannie Fresh is often credited for much of the popularity for Bounce outside of New Orleans. Drake, also signed to Cash Money recently collaborated with New Orleans Bounce producer Blaqnmild on his international hits "Nice For What" and "In My Feelings". Jay Electronica, signed to Jay-Z's Roc Nation record label, has projected into the hip-hop scene.

Eastside New Orleans Rapper Currensy resides in New Orleans. Rappers Corner Boy P, Young Roddy, Trademark da Skydiver, and Fiend are from New Orleans. Most of the Jet Life collective is from New Orleans or surrounding areas.

New Orleans is also known for a hip hop duo known as the $UICIDEBOY$, who are known for their blend of Memphis Hip-Hop beats with guttural, heavy lyrics dealing with drug usage and depression, similar to sludge metal, another prominent genre of the city.

== Heavy metal ==
New Orleans has an active metal scene which began to take real form in the late 1980s. Bands such as Eyehategod, Down, Exhorder, Crowbar, Acid Bath, Soilent Green, Goatwhore, Kingdom of Sorrow, Graveyard Rodeo and Superjoint Ritual are either based in the city, or have a majority of their members hailing from the area. Artists such as Mike Williams, Jimmy Bower, Brian Patton, Phil Anselmo, Kirk Windstein, Pepper Keenan, Pat Bruders, Stanton Moore and Kyle Thomas are New Orleans residents.

The city is known for the "Louisiana sound", which was pioneered by Exhorder, who was the first band to combine groove metal and up-tempo thrash metal. Several of these metal groups share a style which draws inspiration from Black Sabbath, Melvins, hardcore punk as well as Southern rock. There is still variance within the sounds of the scene, however. Eyehategod features very harsh vocals and guitar distortion; Down has a style closer to classic rock; Crowbar's music has mostly slow tempos and a downtuned guitar sound; and Soilent Green has a sound which is closer to grindcore.

Members of New Orleans’ heavy metal bands are also typically part of another band from New Orleans or Louisiana, and collaborations between members of multiple bands are also common. In addition to being one of the founding members of Eyehategod, Jimmy Bower is also a member of Down, a member of Superjoint Ritual and has worked several times with Crowbar. Pepper Keenan, member of Corrosion of Conformity (who originate from North Carolina), is a member of Down and also worked on Eyehategod's album Dopesick. Kirk Windstein is a founding member of Crowbar, a member of Kingdom of Sorrow, and a member of Down. Phil Anselmo is a member of Down, a member of Superjoint Ritual as well as various metal acts based in New Orleans; he also has a hardcore punk side project along with Mike Williams of Eyehategod and Hank Williams III named Arson Anthem. Brian Patton is former member of Eyehategod and current member of Soilent Green. L. Ben Falgoust II is the singer of Goatwhore and Soilent Green.

== See also ==
- Doctors, Professors, Kings & Queens
