= Professor Longhair =

American blues musician (1918–1980)

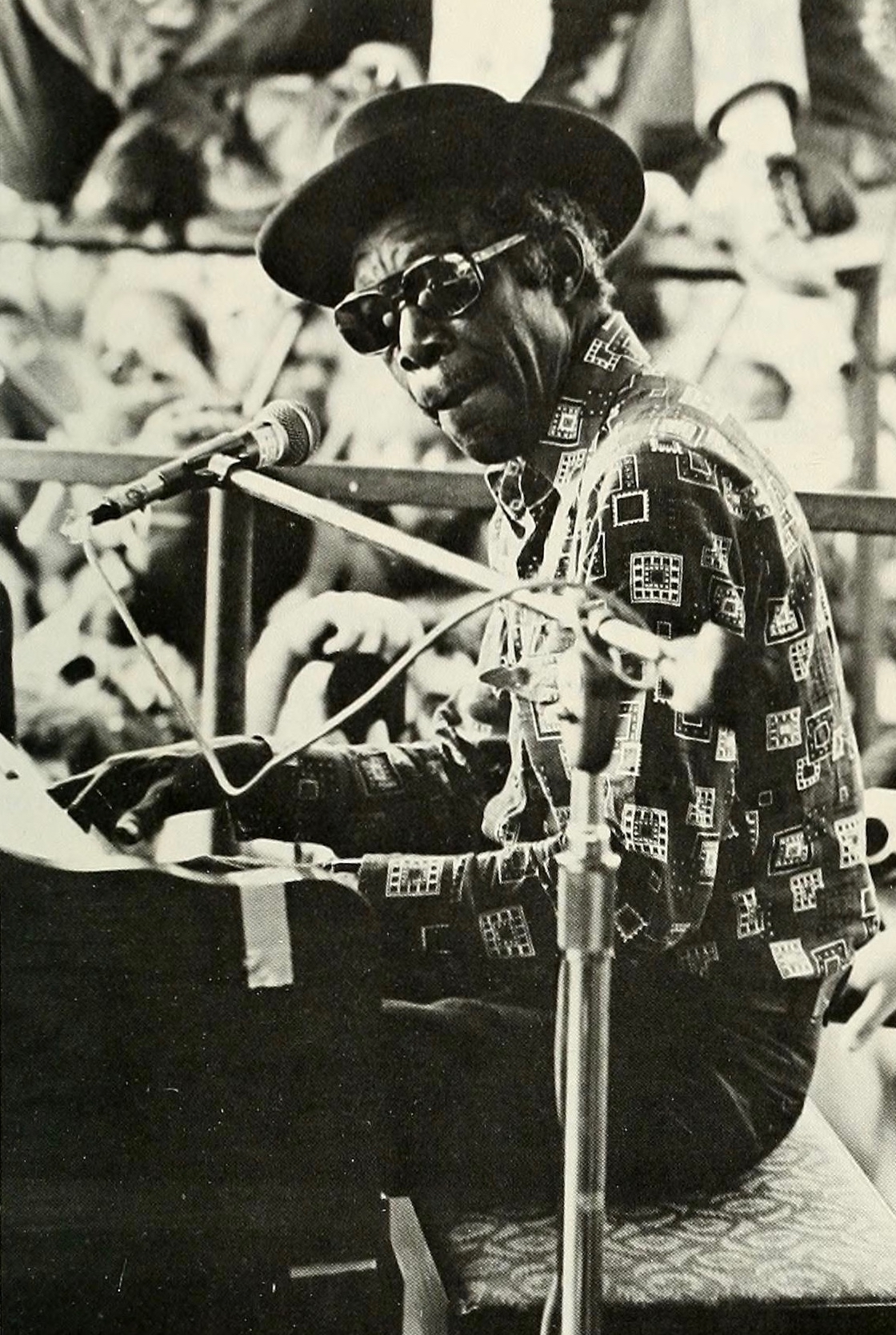
- Professor Longhair at the 1975 New Orleans Jazz & Heritage Festival

Background information
- Also known as: Fess
- Born: Henry Roeland Byrd; December 19, 1918; Bogalusa, Louisiana, U.S.
- Origin: New Orleans, Louisiana, U.S.
- Died: January 30, 1980 (aged 61) New Orleans, Louisiana, U.S.
- Genres: New Orleans blues; New Orleans R&B; Louisiana blues; boogie-woogie; proto-funk
- Occupation: Musician
- Instruments: Vocals, piano
- Years active: 1948–1980

Henry Roeland Byrd (December 19, 1918 – January 30, 1980), better known as Professor Longhair or Fess for short, was an American singer and pianist who performed New Orleans blues. He was active in two distinct periods, first in the heyday of early rhythm and blues and later in the resurgence of interest in traditional jazz after the founding of the New Orleans Jazz and Heritage Festival in 1970. His piano style has been described as "instantly recognizable, combining rumba, mambo, and calypso".

Music journalist Tony Russell (in his book The Blues: From Robert Johnson to Robert Cray) wrote that "The vivacious rhumba-rhythmed piano blues and choked singing typical of Fess were too weird to sell millions of records; he had to be content with siring musical offspring who were simple enough to manage that, like Fats Domino or Huey "Piano" Smith. But he is also acknowledged as a father figure by subtler players like Allen Toussaint and Dr. John."

== Biography ==
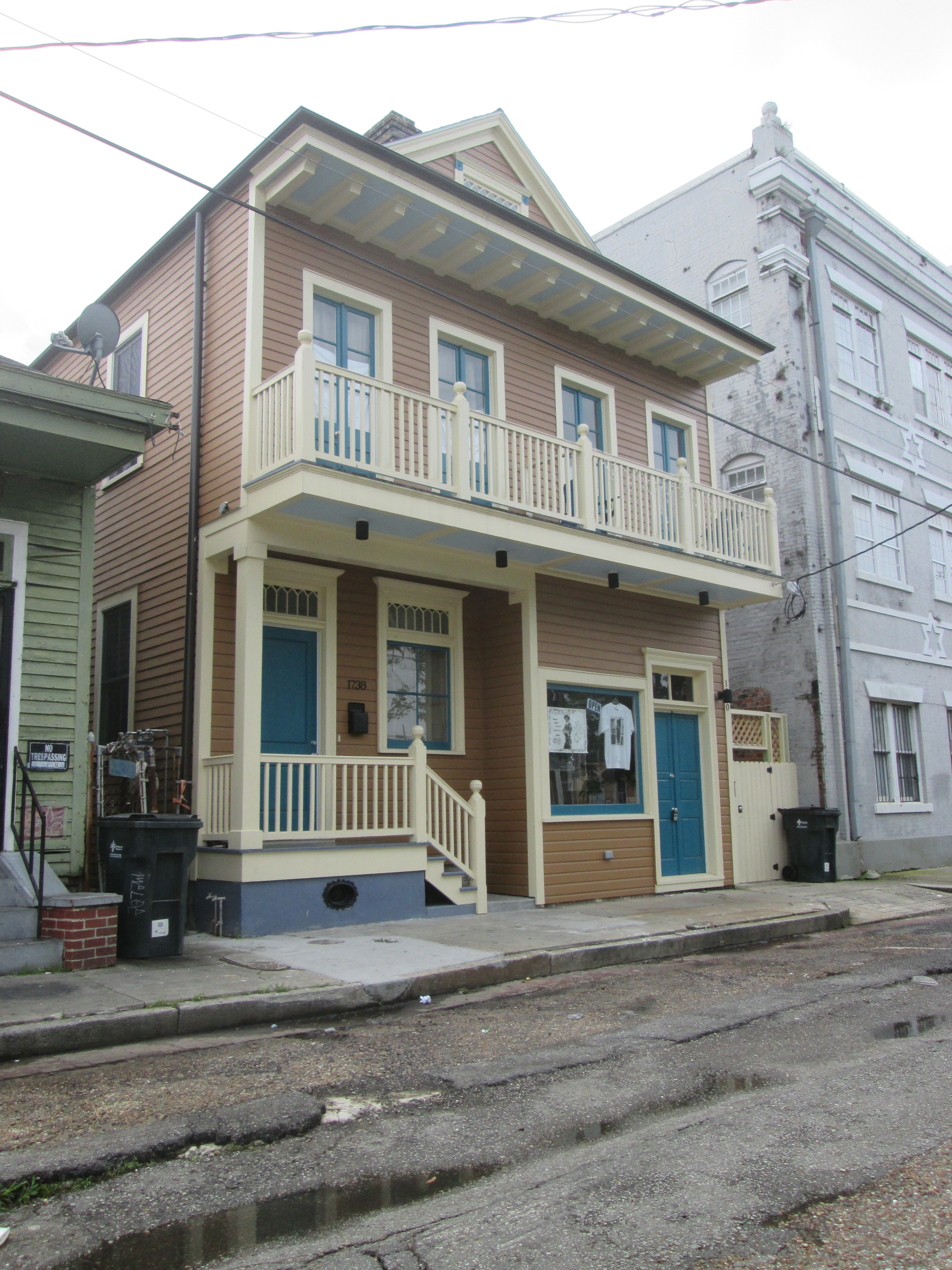
Former home of Professor Longhair, in 2015

Byrd was born on December 19, 1918, in Bogalusa, Louisiana, the son of Ella Mae (née Rhodes) and James Byrd. His distinctive style of piano playing was influenced by learning to play on an instrument that was missing some keys.

Around 1921 he and his mother moved to New Orleans and as a child learned to play piano on worn-out uprights he found discarded in alleyways. He began his career in New Orleans in 1948. Mike Tessitore, owner of the Caldonia Club, gave Longhair his stage name. Longhair first recorded in a band called the Shuffling Hungarians in 1949, creating four songs (including the first version of his signature song, "Mardi Gras in New Orleans") for the Star Talent record label. Union problems curtailed their release, but Longhair's next effort for Mercury Records the same year was a winner. Throughout the 1950s, he recorded for Atlantic Records, Federal Records and local labels.

Professor Longhair had only one national commercial hit, "Bald Head", in 1950, under the name Roy Byrd and His Blues Jumpers. He also recorded his favorites, "Tipitina" and "Go to the Mardi Gras". He lacked crossover appeal among white and wide audiences. Yet, he is regarded (and was acknowledged) as being a musician who was highly influential for other prominent musicians, such as Fats Domino, Allen Toussaint and Dr. John.

After suffering a stroke, Professor Longhair recorded "No Buts – No Maybes" in 1957. He re-recorded "Go to the Mardi Gras" in 1959. He first recorded "Big Chief" with its composer, Earl King, in 1964. In the 1960s, Professor Longhair's career faltered. He became a janitor to support himself and fell into a gambling habit.

After a few years during which he disappeared from the music scene, Professor Longhair's musical career finally received "a well deserved renaissance" and wide recognition. He was invited to perform at the New Orleans Jazz and Heritage Festival in 1971 and at the Newport Jazz Festival and the Montreux Jazz Festival in 1973. His album The London Concert showcases work he did on a visit to the United Kingdom. That significant career resurrection saw the recording of the album Live on the Queen Mary, which was recorded on March 24, 1975, during a private party hosted by Paul McCartney and Linda McCartney on board the retired RMS Queen Mary.

By the 1980s his albums, such as Crawfish Fiesta on Alligator Records and New Orleans Piano on Atlantic Records, which compiled recordings he made for the label in 1949 and 1953, had become readily available across America. In 1974 he appeared on the PBS series Soundstage (with Dr. John, Earl King, and The Meters). In 1980 he co-starred (with Tuts Washington and Allen Toussaint) in the film documentary Piano Players Rarely Ever Play Together which was produced and directed by filmmaker Stevenson Palfi. That documentary (which aired on public television in 1982 and has rarely been seen since), plus a long interview with Fess (which was recorded two days before his sudden death), were included in the 2018 released project "Fess Up".

Professor Longhair died in his sleep of a heart attack while the filming of the documentary was under way (and before the live concert, which was planned to be its climax). Footage from his funeral was included in the documentary. He was interred at Mount Olivet Cemetery in New Orleans.

Professor Longhair's manager through those renaissance years of his career was Allison Miner, of which jazz producer George Wein was quoted saying: "Her devotion to Professor Longhair gave him the best years of his life."

== Accolades ==
Professor Longhair was inducted into the Blues Hall of Fame in 1981. In 1987, he was awarded a posthumous Grammy Award for a collection of recordings produced by Quint Davis in 1971 and 1972 released as House Party New Orleans Style. He was inducted into the Rock and Roll Hall of Fame in 1992.

Professor Longhair was inducted into the Louisiana Music Hall of Fame in 2016 at his former home in New Orleans.

== In popular culture ==
His song "Tipitina" was covered by Hugh Laurie on the 2011 CD album Let Them Talk. Laurie is a long-time fan, having used Longhair's "Go to the Mardi Gras" as the theme for the pilot episode of A Bit of Fry & Laurie. Laurie used to perform these two songs regularly during his world concert tours of 2011–2014 with The Copper Bottom Band, and in March 2013 paid tribute to Professor Longhair in a special concert on board RMS Queen Mary.

The New Orleans music venue Tipitina's is named after one of Longhair's signature songs, and was created specifically as a venue for Longhair to perform in his aged years. A bust of Professor Longhair, sculpted by bluesman Coco Robicheaux, greets visitors upon entering the venue.

== Afro-Cuban elements ==
In the 1940s, Professor Longhair was playing with Caribbean musicians, listening a lot to Perez Prado's mambo records, and absorbing and experimenting with it all. He was especially enamored with Cuban music. Longhair's style was known locally as "rumba-boogie". Alexander Stewart stated that Longhair was a key figure bridging the worlds of boogie-woogie and the new style of rhythm and blues. In his composition "Misery", Professor Longhair played a habanera-like figure in his left hand. The deft use of triplets in the right hand is a characteristic of Longhair's style.

Tresillo, the habanera, and related African-based single-celled figures have long been heard in the left hand-part of piano compositions by New Orleans musicians, such as Louis Moreau Gottschalk ("Souvenirs from Havana", 1859) and Jelly Roll Morton ("The Crave", 1910). One of Longhair's great contributions was the adaptation of Afro-Cuban two-celled, clave-based patterns in New Orleans blues. Michael Campbell stated, "Rhythm and blues influenced by Afro-Cuban music first surfaced in New Orleans. Professor Longhair's influence was ... far reaching. In several of his early recordings, Professor Longhair blended Afro-Cuban rhythms with rhythm and blues. The most explicit is 'Longhair's Blues Rhumba', where he overlays a straightforward blues with a clave rhythm." The guajeo-like piano part for the rumba-boogie "Mardi Gras in New Orleans" (1949) employs the 2-3 clave onbeat/offbeat motif. The 2–3 clave time line is written above the piano excerpt for reference.

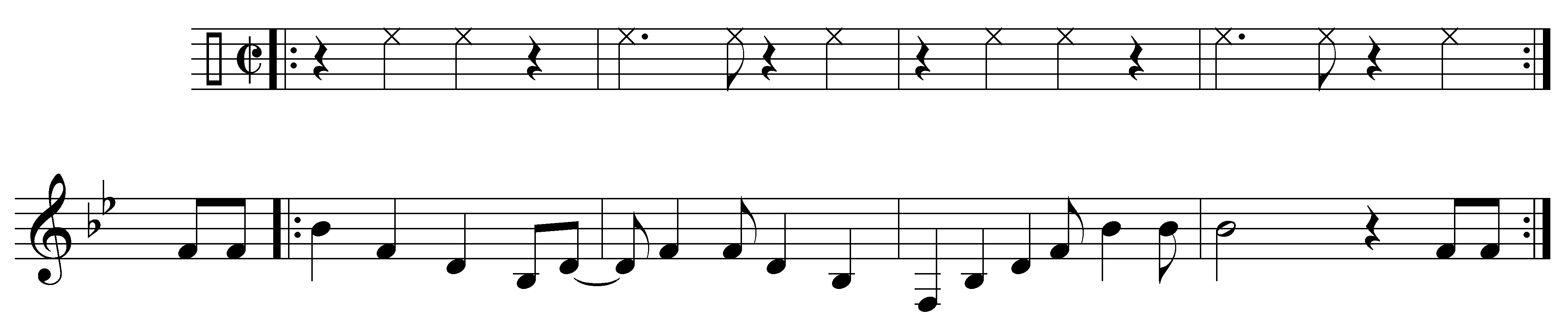
Piano excerpt from the rumba boogie "Mardi Gras in New Orleans" (1949) by Professor Longhair. 2–3 clave is written above for rhythmic reference.

According to Dr. John, the Professor "put funk into music ... Longhair's thing had a direct bearing I'd say on a large portion of the funk music that evolved in New Orleans." This is the syncopated, but straight subdivision feel of Cuban music (as opposed to swung subdivisions). Alexander Stewart stated that the popular feel was passed along from "New Orleans—through James Brown's music, to the popular music of the 1970s," adding, "The singular style of rhythm & blues that emerged from New Orleans in the years after World War II played an important role in the development of funk. In a related development, the underlying rhythms of American popular music underwent a basic, yet generally unacknowledged transition from triplet or shuffle feel to even or straight eighth notes. Concerning funk motifs, Stewart stated, "This model, it should be noted, is different from a time line (such as clave and tresillo) in that it is not an exact pattern, but more of a loose organizing principle."

== Discography ==
=== Albums ===
- Rock 'n' Roll Gumbo (1974)
- Live on the Queen Mary (1978)
- Crawfish Fiesta (1980)
- The London Concert, with Alfred "Uganda" Roberts (1981) (also known as The Complete London Concert)
- The Last Mardi Gras (1982)
- Mardi Gras in New Orleans: Live 1975 Recording (1982)
- House Party New Orleans Style: The Lost Sessions, 1971–1972 (1987)
- Ball the Wall! Live at Tipitina's 1978 (2004)
- Live in Germany (1978)
- Live in Chicago (1976)

=== Compilations ===
- New Orleans Piano (1972) (also known as New Orleans Piano: Blues Originals, Vol. 2)
- Mardi Gras In New Orleans 1949–1957 (1981)
- Mardi Gras in Baton Rouge (1991)
- Fess: The Professor Longhair Anthology (1993)
- Fess' Gumbo (1996)
- Collector's Choice (1996), half an album of hits
- Way Down Yonder in New Orleans (1997)
- All His 78's (1999)
- The Chronological Professor Longhair 1949 (2001)
- Tipitina: The Complete 1949–1957 New Orleans Recordings (2008)
- The Primo Collection (2009)
- Rockin' with Fess (2013)

Source: Professor Longhair discography, AllMusic

== Filmography ==
- Dr. John's New Orleans Swamp (1974)
- Piano Players Rarely Ever Play Together (1982), award-winning 76-minute documentary film featuring Professor Longhair, Tuts Washington, and Allen Toussaint
- Fess Up (2018), the feature-length interview with Professor Longhair

== Quotation ==
Black or white, local or out-of-town, they all had Longhair's music in common. Just that mambo-rhumba boogie thing.

— Allen Toussaint
