= I Walk on Guilded Splinters =

Song by Dr. John

from the album Gris-Gris
- Released: January 22, 1968
- Recorded: 1967, Los Angeles
- Genre: New Orleans R&B; psychedelic rock
- Length: 7:37
- Label: Atco
- Songwriter: Dr. John Creaux
- Producer: Harold Battiste

"I Walk on Guilded Splinters" (sometimes "I Walk on Gilded Splinters" or "Walk on Gilded Splinters") is a song written by Mac Rebennack using his pseudonym of Dr. John Creaux. It first appeared as the closing track of his debut album Gris-Gris (1968), credited to Dr. John the Night Tripper. The song has subsequently been performed and recorded by many other musicians, including Widespread Panic, The Neville Brothers, Cher, Marsha Hunt, Johnny Jenkins, Humble Pie, King Swamp, the Allman Brothers Band, Paul Weller, the Flowerpot Men, Michael Brecker, Tedeschi Trucks Band and Jello Biafra.

== Title and origins ==
According to Broadcast Music, Inc. (BMI), the legal title of the song is "I Walked on Guilded Splinters". The original liner notes for Gris-Gris contained several unconventional spellings, such as "dreged" and "reincannted", and many later versions of the song have used the orthodox spelling "…Gilded…" rather than "…Guilded…".

Dr. John stated that the song was based on a traditional voodoo church song. He said: "It's supposed to be 'Splendors', but I turned it into 'Splinters'... I just thought splinters sounded better and I always pictured splinters when I sung it." The New Orleans musician Coco Robicheaux, whose name is called out in the song, said:

"Dr. John, he was very much interested in metaphysics... In voodoo they call the gilded splinters the points of a planet. Mystically, they appear like little gilded splinters, like little gold, like fire that holds still. They’re different strengths at different times. I guess it ties in with astrology, and influence the energy. That's what that's about."

== Dr. John recording and reception ==
The sessions for the Gris-Gris album took place in the Gold Star Studios in Los Angeles, California. The album aimed to combine various strains of New Orleans music. It centered on a character named "Dr. John" who was based on a 19th-century healer called Dr. John Montaine, who claimed to be an African potentate. The musicians mostly originated from New Orleans, and as well as Rebennack (vocals, keyboards, guitar, percussion) included arranger and record producer Harold Battiste (bass, clarinet, percussion), together with Richard 'Didimus' Washington (guitar, mandolin, percussion), Plas Johnson (saxophone), Lonnie Boulden (flute), Steve Mann (guitar, banjo), Ernest McLean (guitar, mandolin), Bob West (bass), Mo Pedido (congas), John Boudreaux (drums), and backing singers who included Jessie Hill, Ronnie Barron, Shirley Goodman and Tami Lynn.

Critic Richie Unterberger wrote that "I Walk On Guilded Splinters" was "the album's most durable song, a creepy voodoo soup that both smoldered with ominous foreboding and simmered with temptations of sensual delights." Tom Moon of Rolling Stone described the track as "a masterpiece of vibe that has retained its aura even after being sampled and covered every which way. An ambling processional framed by a simple pentatonic guitar melody, it's everything you want in voodoo music: a feast of pummeling drums, swirling ethereal voices and the patient, mumbled incantations of Dr. John, all coalescing into the sound of a solemn, revelatory ritual." Thom Jurek, at Allmusic, also described it as the album's masterpiece, stating:

"Dr. John is brazen about the power of his spells in a slippery, evil-sounding boast. Congas, tom-toms, snaky guitar, and harmonica underscore his juju, while a backing chorus affirms his power like mambo priestesses in unison. A ghostly baritone saxophone wafts through the turnarounds. Droning blues, steamy funk, and loopy R&B are inseparably entwined in its groove."

== Later recordings ==
An edited version of the song was released in 1969 as a promotional single on the Atlantic label by Cher, produced by Jerry Wexler. It was also included on her album 3614 Jackson Highway. The Gris-Gris recordings had been made during studio time originally reserved for Sonny & Cher, and were released on the Atlantic subsidiary label Atco.

In the United Kingdom and Europe, a version of the song was released by Marsha Hunt as a single on Track Records in 1969. The recording was arranged and produced by Tony Visconti, and the single reached number 46 on the UK singles chart.

Johnny Jenkins recorded the song as the opening track on his album Ton-Ton Macoute! (1970), produced by, and featuring, guitarist Duane Allman. It was issued as a single by Capricorn Records, and was later sampled by Beck in his 1993 song "Loser". The recording with Jenkins also featured on the Duane Allman album An Anthology Vol. II, released in 1974. Long after Duane Allman's death, the Allman Brothers Band performed the song at their 2004 concert at the Fox Theatre in Atlanta, issued as part of their Instant Live album series.

A version of the song lasting over 23 minutes was recorded by Humble Pie on their live album Performance Rockin' the Fillmore (1971). The song was also recorded by the band Widespread Panic, accompanied by Dirty Dozen Brass Band for their live album, Another Joyous Occasion (2000). Paul Weller recorded the song on his album Stanley Road (1995).

Jello Biafra recorded the song in a 13-minute version on his live album of New Orleans-related soul and rock covers, Walk on Jindal's Splinters. Although the recording itself is a straight cover of the song, Biafra's play on the song title for the album itself refers to Louisiana governor Bobby Jindal.

The Drive-By Truckers' recording "Ever South" from their release American Band (2016) features a rhythm track emulating the original "Gris-Gris" recording.

Louisiana native Malcolm "Papa Mali" Welbourne included the song on Thunder Chicken (1999) by Papa Mali & The Instagators, on Fog City records.

Chicago musician Little Lord Robert uses a refrain from the song's lyrics for "Highway Joe" on his album Saint Chicago. Little Lord Robert sings "till it burns up" in place of "till I burn up".

Brit-pop band Oasis sampled the song intro from the Johnny Jenkins cover into their 2000 hit "Go Let It Out".

The song appears in the Hulu miniseries Little Fires Everywhere. The version sung by Paul Weller is played over the montage at the end of season four of The Wire.
