= Babylon (Dr. John album) =

Studio album by Dr. John
- Released: January 17, 1969
- Recorded: late 1968
- Studios: Gold Star (Hollywood, California)
- Genres: Rock; R&B
- Length: 37:59
- Label: Atco
- Producer: Harold Battiste

Dr. John chronology
Gris-Gris (1968)	Babylon (1969)	Remedies (1970)

Babylon is the second album by New Orleans R&B artist Dr. John. In his autobiography, Under A Hoodoo Moon, Dr. John describes the origins of the album in detail:

"Our second album was cut in late 1968—the year of the Tet offensive, and of the assassinations of Bobby Kennedy and Martin Luther King Jr. It was a heavy time for me: Not only was the Vietnam War raging in all its insanity, but, as a semioutlaw, I was being pursued by various kinds of heat across L.A. In its lyrics and music, this album reflects these chaotic days. At times hard-driving, at other times following a deliberately spacy, disorienting groove, Babylon was the band's attempt to say something about the times—and to do it with a few unusual musical time signatures. The lead song, "Babylon", sets the tone. To a 3/4 and 10/4 groove, it lays out my own sick-ass view of the world then—namely, that I felt our number was up. We were trying to get into something...with visions of the end of the world—as if Hieronymus Bosch had cut an album."

Professional ratings
Review scores
Source	Rating
AllMusic	3/5 stars
Head Heritage	Positive
Rolling Stone	(negative)

== Track listing ==
All tracks are written by Dr. John, except where indicated.

Side one
No.	Title	Writer(s)	Length
1.	"Babylon"		5:25
2.	"Glowin'"		5:39
3.	"Black Widow Spider"		5:01
4.	"Barefoot Lady"	Dr. John Creaux, Harold Battiste	3:10

Side two
No.	Title	Length
1.	"Twilight Zone"	8:15
2.	"The Patriotic Flag-Waiver"	4:52
3.	"The Lonesome Guitar Strangler"	5:34

== Personnel ==
- Dr. John – vocals, keyboards, guitar, percussion
- Richard "Didimus" Washington – guitar, percussion
- Plas Johnson – tenor saxophone
- Moe Bechamin – tenor saxophone
- Alvin Robinson – guitar
- Steve Mann – guitar
- Al Frazier – bass
- John Boudreaux – drums
- Ronnie Barron – organ
- Jessie Hill – backing vocals, percussion
- Shirley Goodman – backing vocals
- Tami Lynn – backing vocals
- John McAlister – quarter-tone piano, gongs, celesta

Technical

- Harold Battiste – producer, arranger
- Stanislaw Zagórski – album design
