= Gris-Gris =

Studio album by Dr. John
- Released: January 22, 1968
- Recorded: 1967
- Studios: Gold Star Studios, Los Angeles
- Genres: New Orleans R&B; psychedelic funk; swamp blues; swamp rock
- Length: 33:12
- Label: Atco
- Producer: Harold Battiste

Dr. John chronology
Gris-Gris (1968)	Babylon (1969)

Gris-Gris (stylized as GRIS-gris, /ˈɡriːˌɡriː/, named for a kind of talisman) is the debut album by American musician Dr. John (a.k.a. Mac Rebennack). Produced by Harold Battiste, it was released on Atco Records in 1968. The album introduced Rebennack's Dr. John character, inspired by a reputed 19th century voodoo doctor. The style of Gris-Gris is a hybrid of traditional New Orleans R&B elements and psychedelia. It was recorded in California, albeit with several native New Orleans musicians.

Gris-Gris failed to chart in the United Kingdom and the United States. It was re-issued on compact disc decades later and received much greater praise from modern critics, including being listed at number 143 on the 2003 and 2012 editions and at number 356 on the 2020 edition of Rolling Stone magazine's list of the 500 greatest albums of all time.

== Production ==
Before recording the album, Rebennack was an experienced New Orleans R&B and rock musician playing as a session musician, songwriter, and producer in New Orleans. Due to drug problems and the law, Rebennack moved to Los Angeles in 1965, joining a group of New Orleans session musicians. Rebennack survived by playing with various pop and rock recording sessions, receiving much of this work with the help of New Orleanian arranger Harold Battiste.

Rebennack desired to make an album that combined the various strains of New Orleans music behind a front man called Dr. John, after a black man named Dr. John Montaine, who claimed to be an African potentate. Rebennack chose this name after hearing about Montaine from his sister, and feeling a "spiritual kinship" with him. Rebennack originally wanted New Orleans singer Ronnie Barron to front the band as the Dr. John character, but Don Costa, who managed Barron at the time, advised him against it, claiming it to be a bad career move. Rebennack took on the Dr. John stage name himself.

Gris-Gris was recorded at Gold Star Studios in Los Angeles, California. With an album due and no singer prepared, Dr. John managed to book studio time originally reserved for Sonny & Cher.

== Release and reception ==
Professional ratings
Review scores
Source	Rating
AllMusic	5/5 stars
Head Heritage	(Positive)
Head Heritage	(Positive)
Rolling Stone	4/5 stars

Gris-Gris was released in 1968 on Atco Records, a sub-label of Atlantic Records. Atlantic records president Ahmet Ertegun was reluctant to release the record at first, exclaiming "How can we market this boogaloo crap?" Gris-Gris failed to chart in the United States and United Kingdom. Modern reception of the album has been very positive. Richie Unterberger of AllMusic gave the album five out of five stars, referring to it as "The most exploratory and psychedelic outing of Dr. John's career". In 1999, Tom Moon of Rolling Stone magazine gave the album a positive review, with a rating of four stars out of five. In 2003, the album was ranked number 143 on Rolling Stone's list of the 500 greatest albums of all time, maintaining the rating in a 2012 revised list, before ranked at number 356 on the 2020 revision.

The Wire included Gris Gris in their 1998 list of "100 Records That Set the World on Fire (While No One Was Listening)". The staff wrote that the album fused inspired instrumental combinations with electronic treatments "that owed much to post-Spector LA studio trickery", resulting in music that "constantly unbalanced the ear's efforts to place the music within a continuation of music history. Plas Johnson's playing in particular sounds more like steam powered organ played at a lizard funeral rather than conventional reeds." AllMusic stated that it "sounds like a post-midnight ceremony recorded in the bayou swamp," and named it "among the most enduring recordings of the psychedelic era; it sounds as mysterious and spooky in the 21st century as it did in 1968."

== Track listing ==
Side one
No.	Title	Writer(s)	Length
1.	"Gris-Gris Gumbo Ya Ya"	Dr. John Creaux	5:36
2.	"Danse Kalinda Ba Doom"	Dr. John Creaux, Harold Battiste	3:39
3.	"Mama Roux"	Dr. John Creaux, Jessie Hill	2:59
4.	"Danse Fambeaux"	Dr. John Creaux	4:56

Side two
No.	Title	Writer(s)	Length
1.	"Croker Courtbullion"	Harold Battiste	6:00
2.	"Jump Sturdy"	Dr. John Creaux	2:20
3.	"I Walk on Guilded Splinters"	Dr. John Creaux	7:37

== Personnel ==
=== Musicians ===
- Dr. John (Creaux) "The Night Tripper" – vocals, keyboards, percussion
- "Dr." Harold Battiste – bass, clarinet, percussion, arranger
- "Governor" Plas Johnson – tenor saxophone
- "Dr." Lonnie Boulden – flute
- "Dr." Steve Mann – bottleneck guitar, banjo
- "Dr." Ernest McLean – guitar, mandolin
- "Senator" Bob West – bass
- "Dr." John Boudreaux – drums
- Richard "Dr. Ditmus" Washington – percussion
- Mo "Dido" Pedido – congas
- Dave Dixon, Jessie "Dr. Poo Pah Doo" Hill, Ronnie "The Baron of Ronyards" Barron – backing vocals, percussion
- Joni Jonz, Prince Ella Johnson, Shirley Goodman, Sonny Ray Durden, Tami Lynn – backing vocals

=== Technical ===
- Harold Battiste – producer
- Marvin Israel – design
- Raphael – photography
- Richie Unterberger – reissue liner notes

From liner notes of original LP:

My group consists of Dr. Poo Pah Doo of Destine Tambourine and Dr. Ditmus of Conga, Dr. Boudreaux of Funky Knuckle Skins and Dr. Battiste of Scorpio in Bass Clef, Dr. McLean of Mandolin Comp. School, Dr. Mann of Bottleneck Learning, Dr. Bolden of The Immortal Flute Fleet, The Baron of Ronyards, Dido, China, Goncy O'Leary, Shirley Marie Laveaux, Dr. Durden, Governor Plas Johnson, Senator Bob West Bowing, Croaker Jean Freunx, Sister Stephanie and St. Theresa, John Gumbo, Cecilia La Favorite, Karla Le Jean who were all dreged up from The Rigolets by the Zombie of the Second Line. Under the eight visions of Professor Longhair reincannted the charts of now. I will mash my special faix deaux-deaux on all you who buy my charts, the rites of Coco Robicheaux who, invisible to all but me, will act as a second guardian angel until you over-work him. All who attend our rites will receive kites from the second tier of Tit Alberto who brought the Saute Chapeau. To Chieu Va Bruler up to us from the Antilles to the bayou St. John. Aunt Francis who told me the epic of Jump Sturdy and Apricot Glow. Mimi, who in silence, says the lyrics to Mamma Roux in Chipacka the Chopatoulis Chocktaws without teepees on Magnolia Street and wise to the Zulu parade and the golden blade the sun-up to sun-down second liners who dig Fat Tuesday more than anybody and that's plenty. I have also dug up the old Danse Kalinda to remind you we have not chopped out the old chants and the new Croaker Courtbuillion to serve Battiste style of Phyco-Delphia. We did the snake a la gris-gris calimbo to frame our thing into the medium of down under yonder fire. We walked on gilded splinters to shove my point across to you whom I will communicate with shortly through the smoke of deaux-deaux the rattlesnake whose forked tongue hisses pig Latin in silk and satin da-zaw-ig-day may the gilded splinters of Aunte Andre spew forth in your path to light and guide your way through the bayous of life on your pirougue of heartaches and good times... Push and the shove that you need to get your point across no matter what the cost.

— Gris-Gris, Liner notes
