= The Sun, Moon & Herbs =

Studio album by Dr. John
- Released: August 31, 1971
- Recorded: July – October 1970
- Studios: Trident (London, England); Criteria (Miami, Florida); Dimension Recorders (Hollywood, California)
- Genre: Rock
- Length: 38:59
- Label: Atlantic
- Producers: Mac Rebennack, Charles Greene

Dr. John chronology
Remedies (1970)	The Sun, Moon & Herbs (1971)	Dr. John's Gumbo (1972)

Professional ratings
Review scores
Source	Rating
AllMusic	3.5/5 stars
Christgau's Record Guide	C+
Rolling Stone	(mixed)

The Sun, Moon & Herbs is the fourth studio album by New Orleans R&B artist Dr. John. Released in 1971, The Sun, Moon & Herbs is noted for its contributions from Eric Clapton, Mick Jagger, and other well-known musicians. It was originally intended to be a three-album set but was cut down to a single disc. The album was described by James Chrispell on AllMusic as "dark and swampy" and "best listened to on a hot, muggy night with the sound of thunder rumbling off in the distance like jungle drums". The album was Dr. John's first album to reach the Billboard 200, spending five weeks there and peaking at number 184 on November 6, 1971.

== Track listing ==
All tracks are written by Mac Rebennack except where noted.

Side one
No.	Title	Length
1.	"Black John the Conqueror"	6:20
2.	"Where Ya at Mule"	4:56
3.	"Craney Crow"	6:40

Side two
No.	Title	Writer(s)	Length
1.	"Familiar Reality (Opening)"	Rebennack, Jesse Hill	5:25
2.	"Pots on Fiyo (Filé Gumbo) / Who I Got to Fall On (If the Pot Get Heavy)"		5:48
3.	"Zu Zu Mamou"		7:57
4.	"Familiar Reality (Reprise)"	Rebennack, Jesse Hill	1:53

== Personnel ==
Musicians

- Dr. John – vocals, piano, organ, guitar, vibes, percussion
- Tommy Ferrone – rhythm guitar
- John Boudreaux – drums

The Memphis Horns

- Andrew Love – tenor saxophone
- Jack Hale Sr. – trombone
- James Mitchell – baritone saxophone
- Ed Logan – tenor saxophone
- Roger Hopps – trumpet
- Wayne Jackson – trumpet, horn

(tracks 1, 2, 5)

Guest musicians

- Eric Clapton – slide guitar (on “Black John The Conqueror”) wheres eric
- Ronnie Barron – keyboards (track 4)
- Graham Bond – alto saxophone (track 1)
- Steve York – acoustic bass (tracks 5, 6)
- Jesse Boyce – bass (track 3), percussion (track 6)
- Carl Radle – Fender bass (tracks 2, 7)
- Ron Johnson – bass (track 4)
- Walter Davis Jr. – piano (tracks 1, 3, 5)
- Jim Gordon – percussion, conga (tracks 2, 7)
- Vic Brox – pocket trumpet & organ
- Ray Draper – tuba, percussion & background vocals
- Chris Mercer – saxophone (tracks 1, 2, 7)
- Jerry Jumonville – saxophone (track 4)
- Bobby Keys – tenor saxophone (tracks 2, 7)
- Jim Price – trumpet (tracks 5, 7)
- Edward R. Hoerner – trumpet (track 4)
- Kenneth Terroade – flute (tracks 1, 3, 5, 6)
- Calvin "Fuzzy" Samuels – percussion (track 5)
- Freeman Brown – percussion (track 3, 5, 6)
- Freddie Staehle – trap drums
- Mick Jagger (track 2), Doris Troy, Shirley Goodman, Tami Lynn, P. P. Arnold, Bobby Whitlock, Joni Jonz – backing vocals

Technical

- Dr. John – producer, arranger
- Charles Greene – producer
- Roy Thomas Baker – engineer
- Juddy Phillips – engineer (track 4)
- Albhy Galuten, Tom Dowd – remix engineers
- Howard Albert, Karl Richardson, Ron Albert – overdub engineers
- John Millerburg – design concept
- Gary Burgess – photography
