= Dr. John's Gumbo =

Studio album by Dr. John
- Released: April 20, 1972
- Studios: Sound City (Van Nuys, California)
- Genres: New Orleans blues; R&B; rock and roll; roots rock
- Length: 39:22
- Label: Atco
- Producers: Harold Battiste, Jerry Wexler

Dr. John chronology
The Sun, Moon & Herbs (1971)	Dr. John's Gumbo (1972)	In the Right Place (1973)

Singles from Dr. John's Gumbo
- 1. "Iko Iko" Released: March 1972

Dr. John's Gumbo is the fifth album by the New Orleans singer and pianist Dr. John. Released in 1972, it is a tribute to the music of his native city. The album is a collection of classic New Orleans tunes.

In 2012, the album was ranked number 404 on Rolling Stone's list of "The 500 Greatest Albums of All Time". The album cover was shot in front of the huge mural adorning the wall of The Farmer John Company (also seen in the movie Carrie), located at Soto Street and Vernon in Vernon, California. The album was on the Billboard 200 for eleven weeks, charting as high as No. 112 on June 24, 1972.

== Background ==
Whereas his previous album, The Sun, Moon & Herbs (1971), featured a blend of psychedelic rock and Voodoo imagery, this album saw Dr. John return to the musical roots of his hometown, New Orleans. It was co-produced by Harold Battiste and Jerry Wexler, and recorded at Sound City Studios in Van Nuys, California.

Dr. John had been active as a session musician in the New Orleans music scene under his birth name, Mac Rebennack, and was particularly influenced by the music of Professor Longhair. Through this album, he paid tribute to the New Orleans rhythm and blues he had encountered during the late 1940s and 1950s. The album features reinterpretations of classic New Orleans songs, reducing the psychedelic elements prominent on his previous releases in favor of arrangements centered on piano, horns, and the rhythm section. It is regarded as a turning point in Dr. John's career, marking a shift away from the eccentric and mystical stage persona of his early years toward a more straightforward and traditional musical identity rooted in the New Orleans rhythm and blues tradition.

The recording sessions featured several musicians from the New Orleans music scene. Saxophonists Lee Allen and Harold Battiste, cornetist Melvin Lastie, and pianist and organist Ronnie Barron were among the participants. Jimmy Calhoun played bass, while Freddie Staehle played drums. Guitarists Ken Klimak and Alvin Robinson also contributed, and Richard Washington played percussion. Several female vocalists provided backing vocals, adding to the lively atmosphere characteristic of New Orleans rhythm and blues.

The album cover was photographed in front of a large mural on the exterior wall of the Farmer John Company building, near the intersection of Soto Street and Vernon Avenue in Vernon, California. The mural later appeared in the film Carrie.

== Critical reception ==
Professional ratings
Review scores
Source	Rating
AllMusic	4.5/5 stars
Creem	A−
Sputnikmusic	4.5/5

In a July 1972 review published in Creem, Dave Marsh described the album as Dr. John's fifth release, yet one that felt as though it were his debut. He emphasized its shift away from the Voodoo and psychedelic rock elements found in his earlier work, highlighting its focus on New Orleans rhythm and blues.

AllMusic critic Stephen Thomas Erlewine likewise praised the album for reinterpreting New Orleans classics through a combination of early rock and roll, blues, and rhythm and blues, and regarded it as one of Dr. John's finest works.

== Track listing ==
1. "Iko Iko" (James "Sugar Boy" Crawford) – 4:08
2. "Blow Wind Blow" (Huey "Piano" Smith, Izzy Cougarden) – 3:17
3. "Big Chief" (Earl King) – 3:25
4. "Somebody Changed the Lock" (Mac Rebennack) – 2:42
5. "Mess Around" (Ahmet Ertegun) – 3:09
6. "Let the Good Times Roll" (Earl King) – 3:56
7. "Junko Partner" (Traditional; arranged by Wee Willie Wayne) – 4:27
8. "Stack-A-Lee" (Traditional; arranged by Leon T. Gross (Archibald)) – 3:28
9. "Tipitina" (Professor Longhair) – 2:04
10. "Those Lonely Lonely Nights" (Earl King, Johnny Vincent) – 2:30
11. "Huey Smith Medley" (Huey "Piano" Smith, Johnny Vincent) – 3:17
  1. "High Blood Pressure"
  2. "Don't You Just Know It"
  3. "Well I'll Be John Brown"
12. "Little Liza Jane" (Huey "Piano" Smith, Johnny Vincent) – 2:59

"Thanks to Peter Wolf of the J. Geils Band for the suggestion to cut 'Iko Iko'"

== Personnel ==
- Dr. John – vocals, piano, cornet; guitar on "Let the Good Times Roll"
- Lee Allen – tenor saxophone
- Ronnie Barron – organ, electric piano, backing vocals; piano on "Let the Good Times Roll"
- Harold Battiste – saxophone; clarinet on "Somebody Changed the Lock"; vocal and horn arrangements
- Moe Bechamin – saxophone, backing vocals
- Sidney George – saxophone; harmonica on "Let the Good Times Roll"
- Dave Lastie – saxophone
- Melvin Lastie – trumpet, cornet
- John Ewing – trombone
- Shirley Goodman, Tami Lynn, Robbie Montgomery, Jessica Smith – backing vocals
- Alvin Robinson – guitar, backing vocals
- Ken Klimak – guitar
- Jimmy Calhoun – bass
- Freddie Staehle – drums, percussion
- Richard "Didimus" Washington – percussion

Technical

- Harold Battiste – producer
- Jerry Wexler – producer
- Keith Olsen, Gary Brandt – engineer
- Tom Wilkes – design, photography
- Barry Feinstein – design, photography
