= Girls Are Out to Get You =

Single by The Fascinations
- B-side: "You'll Be Sorry"
- Released: December 1966
- Genre: Funk, soul
- Length: 1:58
- Label: Mayfield
- Songwriter: Curtis Mayfield
- Producer: Curtis Mayfield

The Fascinations singles chronology
"Say It Isn't So" (1966)	"Girls Are Out to Get You" (1966)	"I'm in Love" / "I Can't Stay Away from You" (1967)

"Girls Are Out to Get You" is a song and single by American soul group, The Fascinations. Written and produced by Curtis Mayfield, it was first released in 1967.

== Background and chart success ==
Released in the US in 1967 on Mayfield's own Mayfield Records label. It features Donny Hathaway on piano and is comparatively short at 1 minute and 58 seconds. Motown's Mike Terry played baritone saxophone on the song.

It peaked at 92 in the Billboard Hot 100. In 1971 it became popular on the UK's Northern soul music scene and was re-released on the Sue label. It was later re-released again, on the Mojo label, a subsidiary of Polydor Records, responsible for the re-release of several 1960s soul music songs in the early 1970s including Tami Lynn's "I'm Gonna Run Away from You" and The Formations, "At The Top of The Stairs". This time it reached 32 on the UK charts staying for six weeks. It was The Fascinations only UK hot single.

The Fascinations had disbanded as a group in 1969. Such was the success of this song that they reformed to take advantage of their new-found success in the UK. Touring the country, often performing in front of thousands of fans, "Girls Are Out to Get You" provided the group with their last taste of success before they again disbanded.

Chart (1967)	Peak position
US Billboard Hot 100	92
US Billboard Top Selling R&B Singles	13

Chart (1971)	Peak position
UK Singles (The Official Charts Company)	32
