= Remedies (Dr. John album) =

Studio album by Dr. John
- Released: April 9, 1970
- Recorded: 1969
- Genre: Rock
- Length: 40:39
- Label: Atco
- Producers: Tom Dowd, Charles Greene, Dr. John

Dr. John chronology
Babylon (1969)	Remedies (1970)	The Sun, Moon & Herbs (1971)

Remedies is the third album released by New Orleans R&B artist Dr. John. The photography is by Stephen C. LaVere, taken in 1969 at the Whisky a Go Go.

In a 2010 interview with Uncut, Dr. John explained the "bad trip" environment which led to the epic closing track "Angola Anthem":

"My managers put me in a psych ward. These guys were very bad people – I had gotten busted on a deal, and they got me bonded out of jail, and so when they did I could have got a parole violation. All of this stuff was so unconnected to music that it’s hard to relate it. A friend of mine had just come out of doing 40-something years in Angola [the infamous Louisiana State Penitentiary], he was just someone special in my heart – called Tangleye. And Tangleye says, 'I’m gonna sell you this song. Got it in Angola, but ain’t nobody ever cut this song…' Even now guys I know getting out of Angola know this song. It’s still a horrible place to be."

Professional ratings
Review scores
Source	Rating
AllMusic	3/5 stars
Christgau's Record Guide	B+
Rolling Stone	(mixed)

== Track listing ==
All tracks are written by Mac Rebennack.

Side one
No.	Title	Length
1.	"Loop Garoo"	4:42
2.	"What Goes Around (Comes Around)"	2:57
3.	"Wash, Mama, Wash"	3:42
4.	"Chippy, Chippy"	3:32
5.	"Mardi Gras Day"	8:11

Side two
No.	Title	Length
1.	"Angola Anthem"	17:35

== Personnel ==
- Dr. John – vocals, piano, guitar
- Cold Grits (backing group) – guitars, bass, drums
- Jessie Hill – backing vocals, percussion
- Shirley Goodman, Tami Lynn – backing vocals

Technical

- Tom Dowd – producer
- Charles Greene – producer
- Stanley Moss – artwork, design
- Stephen C. LaVere – photography
