= Things Happen That Way =

Studio album by Dr. John
- Released: September 23, 2022
- Studios: Esplanade Studios (New Orleans, LA); The Music Shed (New Orleans, LA); Dirty Power Studios; Chateau Oblivion
- Genre: Blues rock
- Length: 38:58
- Label: Rounder
- Producers: Dr. John; Shane Theriot; Lukas Nelson & Promise of the Real

Dr. John chronology
Ske-Dat-De-Dat: The Spirit of Satch (2014)	Things Happen That Way (2022)

Things Happen That Way is the final studio album by American musician Dr. John. It was released on September 23, 2022, through Rounder Records, making it his only posthumous release after he died of a heart attack on June 6, 2019, at the age of 77. The recording sessions took place at Esplanade Studios and at The Music Shed in New Orleans, at Dirty Power Studios and at Chateau Oblivion. The album was produced by Shane Theriot and Dr. John, except for the song "I Walk on Guilded Splinters", which was produced with Lukas Nelson & Promise of the Real. It features guest appearances from Aaron Neville, Lukas Nelson, and Willie Nelson. The album was nominated for a Grammy Award for Best Americana Album at the 65th Annual Grammy Awards, but lost to Brandi Carlile's In These Silent Days.

== Critical reception ==
Professional ratings
Aggregate scores
Source	Rating
Metacritic	78/100
Review scores
Source	Rating
AllMusic	3.5/5 stars
Robert Christgau	A−
Classic Rock	3.5/5 stars
Mojo	4/5 stars
Record Collector	3/5 stars
Spectrum Culture	75/100%
Spill	3.5/5 stars
Uncut	7/10

Things Happen That Way was met with generally favorable reviews from music critics. At Metacritic, which assigns a normalized rating out of 100 to reviews from mainstream publications, the album received an average score of 78, based on five reviews.

James McNair of Mojo wrote that "with Willie, his son Lukas's band and Neville helping out elsewhere, there is audible love in the room. Three final, reflective and intimately presented Rebennack originals shine, but best of all, perhaps, is his take on The Traveling Wilburys' End of the Line". AllMusic's Thom Jurek found the album "solid, fun, and a bit sad, but a fitting, heartfelt sign-off from an American treasure. It's quite beautiful". Max Bell of Classic Rock said that "Dr. John sounds in tip-top form here". Sharon O'Connell of Uncut called it "an exemplar of his style, nor (clearly) is it a late-career blooming, but it is a richly resonant farewell from a maverick veteran". Robert Christgau praised the album, naming it "the most committed album hard-hustling New Orleans piano maestro Mac Rebennack recorded in his last two decades on earth". Tom Hull wrote: "on this material his voice is his calling card".

== Track listing ==
No.	Title	Writer(s)	Length
1.	"Funny How Time Slips Away"	Willie Nelson	4:37
2.	"Ramblin' Man"	Hank Williams	3:52
3.	"Gimme That Old Time Religion" (featuring Willie Nelson)		3:24
4.	"I Walk on Guilded Splinters" (featuring Lukas Nelson & Promise of the Real)	Malcolm John Rebennack, Jr.	4:53
5.	"I'm So Lonesome I Could Cry"	Williams	2:59
6.	"End of the Line" (featuring Aaron Neville)	Bob Dylan; George Harrison; Jeff Lynne; Roy Orbison; Tom Petty	4:12
7.	"Holy Water"	Rebennack, Jr.; Shane Theriot	3:24
8.	"Sleeping Dogs Best Left Alone"	Rebennack, Jr.; Theriot	3:59
9.	"Give Myself a Good Talkin' To"	Rebennack, Jr.; Theriot	3:54
10.	"Guess Things Happen That Way"	Jack Henderson Clement	3:44
Total length:			38:58

== Personnel ==
- Mac "Dr. John" Rebennack Jr. – vocals, piano (tracks: 1–3, 5–10), keyboards (track 4), co-producer
- Willie Nelson – vocals & guitar solo (track 3)
- Lukas Nelson – vocals & guitar (track 4), additional mixing
- Aaron Neville – vocals (track 6)
- Katie Pruitt – vocals (tracks: 6, 7)
- Jolynda Kiki Chapman – backing vocals (tracks: 1, 3, 8)
- Yolanda Robinson – backing vocals (tracks: 1, 3, 8)
- Matthew Breaux – backing vocals (track 6)
- Carlo Nuccio – backing vocals (track 6), drums (tracks: 1, 2, 7–10), percussion (tracks: 1, 2, 7)
- Will Lee – backing vocals (track 6), bass (tracks: 2, 9, 10)
- Shane Theriot – backing vocals (tracks: 6, 7), electric guitar (tracks: 1–3, 5–10), baritone guitar (track 1), acoustic guitar (tracks: 2, 3, 5, 6, 8–10), lap steel guitar (tracks: 2, 5, 10), percussion (tracks: 2, 6–9), bass (tracks: 3, 5, 6), arranger (track 3), cardboard box drum (track 5), resonator guitar (track 7), co-producer, additional recording
- Tony Hall – bass (tracks: 1, 7, 8)
- Dave Torkanowsky – Wurlitzer piano (tracks: 1, 6, 7, 9, 10)
- Alonzo Bowens – tenor saxophone (track: 1, 6, 8)
- Leon "Kid Chocolate" Brown – trumpet (track: 1, 6, 8)
- Mark Mullins – trombone & horns arranger (tracks: 1, 6, 8)
- Jon Cleary – B-3 organ (tracks: 3, 6, 8, 9), additional keyboards (track 5)
- Herlin Riley – drums & percussion (tracks: 3, 6)
- Logan Metz – keyboards & lap steel guitar (track 4)
- Corey McCormick – bass (track 4)
- Anthony LoGerfo – drums (track 4)
- Jack Miele – recording, additional editing
- Misha Kachkachishvili – recording
- Buddy Cannon – vocal recording engineer (track 3)
- Tony Castle – vocal recording engineer (track 3)
- Gary Paczosa – vocal recording engineer (tracks: 6, 7)
- John Leventhal – mixing, additional editing
- Robert Wait – additional mixing, additional engineering
- Herman Eng – engineering assistant
- Mark Goodell – additional editing
- Gavin Lurssen – mastering
- Jeff Powell – lacquer cut
- Ken Ehrlich – liner notes

== Charts ==
Chart (2022)	Peak position
Belgian Albums (Ultratop Flanders)	137
Swiss Albums (Schweizer Hitparade)	65
Scottish Albums (Official Charts)	82
UK Country Albums (Official Charts)	3
US Top Album Sales (Billboard)	86
