= Jerry Byrne (singer) =

- Born: Gerard Donald Byrne; February 2, 1941; New Orleans, Louisiana, United States
- Died: April 7, 2010 (aged 69) Morgan City, Louisiana, United States
- Genres: Rock and roll
- Occupations: Singer, businessman
- Years active: 1957–mid-1960s 1980s
- Labels: Specialty

Gerard Donald "Jerry" Byrne (February 2, 1941 – April 7, 2010) was an American rock and roll singer from New Orleans, best known for his 1958 single "Lights Out".

The son of Charles and Mayme Byrne, he was born and raised in the Irish quarter of New Orleans, Louisiana, and, like his cousin Mac Rebennack (later known as Dr. John), became strongly influenced by African-American rhythm and blues. He sang with Rebennack's band, the Loafers, who began performing in local bars and nightclubs. On one occasion in 1957, Byrne joined in with his hero Little Richard on stage in Slidell, Louisiana, and impressed Harold Battiste, then A&R man at Specialty Records, who signed him up soon afterwards to record.

In February 1958, Byrne recorded the song "Lights Out" – a "blistering rocker" written by Rebennack with his friend Seth David – at Cosimo Matassa's studio, with a band that included Edgar Blanchard (guitar), Frank Fields (bass), Art Neville (piano), and Charles "Hungry" Williams (drums). Harold Battiste played saxophone and produced the session. Released on the Specialty label, the record became a regional hit but failed to make the national charts. Nevertheless, Specialty released two further singles by Byrne, "You Know I Love You So" and, in 1959, "Carry On", but neither were successful. Byrne also recorded a novelty tribute record to a local TV personality, as "Morgus and the Three Moguls" with Rebennack and Frankie Ford. In 1960, he, Rebennack and Ford joined forces with Huey "Piano" Smith, collectively credited for contractual reasons as the Cheerleaders, to record "Chinese Bandits", in support of the local football team.

Byrne continued to perform and tour in the region until the mid-1960s, when he gave up his musical career, settled in Morgan City, Louisiana, and started work in the marine supplies business, setting up Byrne Rentals & Sales. In 1987, he was invited to perform in England, and he recorded a new single. "I'm from the South".

Byrne died in Morgan City in 2010, aged 69, from lung cancer. "Lights Out" has been reissued several times, and is included on several rock and roll compilations.
