= Coco Robicheaux =

American blues musician (1947–2011)

Curtis John Arceneaux (October 25, 1947 – November 25, 2011) better known by the name Coco Robicheaux, was an American blues musician from Ascension Parish, Louisiana, United States.

He was born in Merced, California, United States, the son of Herman Arceneaux from Ascension Parish, Louisiana and Virginia Grant of Waushara County, Wisconsin. His father was of Acadian (Cajun) descent, while on his mother's side his ancestry included English, Norwegian, Scottish, German, Dutch, Welsh, and Native American (Mohawk). Also on his mother's side he was a direct descendant of accused Salem witch Sarah Cloyce. He spent some of his preteen/early teens in France where his Air Force father was stationed for three years. He spent some of his childhood in the French countryside.

Arceneaux took his stage name from a Louisiana legend, in which a naughty child called Coco Robicheaux is abducted by a werewolf (Loup Garou or Rougarou). The name 'Coco Robicheaux' is repeated in the song "I Walk on Gilded Splinters" from Dr. John the Night Tripper's 1968 album, Gris-Gris. Robicheaux claimed that he played regularly with Mac Rebennack (Dr. John) in the early 1960s, and said: "Many times I gone and played with him, all around the world, different places. Dr. John, he was very much interested in metaphysics. We had this little place on St. Philip Street. In voodoo they call the gilded splinters the points of a planet. Mystically they appear like little gilded splinters, like little gold, like fire that holds still. They're different strengths at different times. I guess it ties in with astrology, and influence the energy. That's what that's about."

Robicheaux appeared in the episode "Hotshots", of the USA Network series The Big Easy, playing a New Orleans musician named "Coco", who had sold his soul to the devil. Two of Robicheaux's songs were also featured in the episode, "Broken String" and "Spiritland". Robicheaux appeared as himself in four episodes of HBO's Treme, three times in season 1 and once in season 2. He was also one of ten featured musicians in a 2006 documentary titled Chasing the Groove: A New Orleans Funkumentary.

In 2009, Robicheaux was inducted into the Louisiana Music Hall of Fame at a ceremony at the French Quarter House of Blues.

Robicheaux sculpted and cast the bronze bust of Professor Longhair that resides inside the front door at Tipitina's in New Orleans.

Robicheaux died in November 2011 in New Orleans, Louisiana, at the age of 64. Robicheaux died quietly, in his usual spot at his favorite bar, the Apple Barrel.

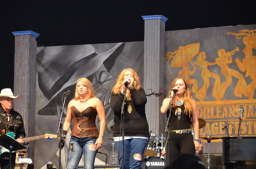
Tribute performance to Robicheaux at 2013 New Orleans Jazz and Heritage Festival

Shortly after Robicheaux's death, two second-line parades were held in his honor, both of which passed by the Apple Barrel bar. Later, more formal musical tributes were held at the French Quarter Festival in March 2012, at the Mid-City Bayou Boogaloo in May 2012, and at the New Orleans Jazz & Heritage Festival in May 2013. In addition, the official 2012 French Quarter Festival poster featured Robicheaux, replacing the figure of Andrew Jackson on horseback in Jackson Square.

One of his last recordings was for the Danish singer Naja Rosa's album The Place I Call Home (2012). His last recording took place on his 64th birthday, one month before his death, with singer Frenchie Moe. Mike Hood, Leon "Kid Chocolate" Brown, Jimmy Carpenter and Jack Cruz also contributed to the song.

== Discography ==
- Spiritland (Orleans 1994)
- Louisiana Medicine Man (Orleans 1998)
- Hoodoo Party (Orleans 2000)
- Yeah, U Rite! (Spiritland 2005)
- Like I Said, Yeah, U Rite! (Spiritland 2008)
- Revelator (Spiritland 2010)
