= James Andrews (musician) =

American trumpeter, vocalist and bandleader (born 1969)

- Born: January 12, 1969 (age 56)
- Occupation: Musician
- Family: Troy Andrews (brother); Jesse Hill (grandfather)
- Musical career
- Origin: New Orleans, Louisiana

James Andrews (born January 12, 1969) is an American musician from New Orleans. He is from a musical family; he is the grandson of Jesse Hill, the older brother of Troy Andrews (better known by his stage name of "Trombone Shorty"), and cousin of Glen David Andrews and the late Travis "Trumpet Black" Hill. A trumpeter and vocalist, Andrews has the nickname "Satchmo of the Ghetto". Raised in the Tremé neighborhood, Andrews played in a number of brass bands, including the Treme Brass Band, Junior Olympia Brass Band and the New Birth Brass Band, before launching his own band, James Andrews and the Crescent City Allstars. He also played with the multi-instrumentalist Danny Barker. In 1998, he released the album Satchmo of the Ghetto, which was produced by Allen Toussaint and featured Dr. John on all eleven tracks.

In 2005, shortly after Hurricane Katrina, Andrews was one of the first musicians to return to New Orleans following the flooding. He and his brother Trombone Shorty played at Jackson Square 17 days after Katrina hit the area and, at a later show at the New Orleans Jazz National Historical Park, Andrews declared, "We're gonna rebuild this city, note by note."

Andrews appeared as himself in three episodes of the HBO series Treme, "Do Watcha Wanna", "Smoke My Peace Pipe" and "Yes We Can Can".
