= Ernest McLean =

American jazz musician

- Born: March 23, 1925; New Orleans, Louisiana, United States
- Died: February 24, 2012 (aged 86) Los Angeles, California
- Genres: Blues, jazz
- Occupation: Musician
- Instrument: Guitar • Banjo • Mandolin
- Years active: 1945–2010

Ernest J. McLean (March 23, 1925 – February 24, 2012) was an American rhythm and blues and jazz guitarist.

== Career ==
Born in New Orleans, McLean was the son of musician Richard McLean, who played banjo in a government music project band, and his wife Beatrice. He began learning guitar at the age of 11. After the end of World War II, he joined Dave Bartholomew's band. The band featured drummer Earl Palmer and saxophonists Lee Allen, Herb Hardesty and Red Tyler, and became the best-known in New Orleans. They performed on many recordings, notably those made at Cosimo Matassa's studio. In the late 1940s and early 1950s, McLean was featured on many of the most successful and influential recordings of the era, including Fats Domino's "The Fat Man", Lloyd Price's "Lawdy Miss Clawdy", and recordings by Shirley and Lee, Little Richard and Smiley Lewis.

In the late 1950s, encouraged by his friend Scatman Crothers, McLean followed bandmate Earl Palmer to Los Angeles, where he began working in Earl Bostic's band. In the early 1960s he was hired by Walt Disney to perform at Disneyland. There he played jazz standards and regularly performed in the New Orleans Square for the next 35 years. He also played on occasional recording sessions for Lou Rawls, Sonny and Cher, and Screamin' Jay Hawkins, most notably featuring on Dr. John's debut album Gris-Gris recorded in 1967 on which he played guitar and mandolin, an instrument he had never previously played.

In 2010, he took part in a Rock and Roll Hall of Fame tribute to Dave Bartholomew at Case Western University. He died in Los Angeles in 2012 at the age of 86.
