= Mojo Records (UK) =

Record label

Mojo
- Parent company: Polydor
- Founded: 1971
- Status: Defunct
- Genre: Soul
- Country of origin: UK
- Location: London

Mojo Records is a British record label that was formed in 1971 as a subsidiary of Polydor Records.

The label provided UK releases for some of the best contemporary US soul and R&B recordings. The label issued many soul singles from American artists including Tami Lynn, The Fascinations, Timmy Thomas, Doris Troy, Donnie Elbert, James Carr and Jamo Thomas.

== See also ==
- List of record labels

== Sources ==
- "Mojo Records (Polydor) forum discussion". www.soul-source.co.uk. February 2007.
- "Mojo - Label Discography". This page lists Mojo's releases with reproductions of the disk labels.
