= New Birth Brass Band =

The New Birth Brass Band was formed by the trumpeter and vocalist James Andrews. The intent was a renewal of New Orleans brass band tradition. As Andrews said, "The old cats used to play a lot of sacred dirges and church hymns and traditional standards, and we just got a new spin with our own music and a new beat."

The band's first album, D-Boy, produced by Allen Toussaint, was released on February 25, 1997.
