= John Boudreaux =

American drummer

Background information
- Born: John Mortimer Boudreaux, Jr. December 10, 1936; New Roads, Louisiana
- Died: January 14, 2017 (aged 80) Los Angeles, California
- Genres: Rhythm and Blues
- Occupation: Drummer
- Years active: c.1950s - 2000s

John Mortimer Boudreaux, Jr. (December 10, 1936, New Roads, Louisiana – January 14, 2017, Los Angeles) was an American drummer who was active in jazz, soul, and rhythm & blues idioms.

== Early years ==
Boudreaux moved to New Orleans at age ten or twelve with his mother to live with his grandmother on St. Philip Street, across the street from the Caledonia Inn, where Professor Longhair would land a gig in 1949 replacing Dave Bartholomew's swing band. His grandfather played bass drum and was Grand Marshal in the New Roads Mardi Gras parade. As a child, he studied with Harold Battiste, Ed Blackwell, and Ellis Marsalis on drums. "I wanted to play saxophone but the drum and the saxophone were two different prices. The drum—we’re talking snare drum—was a lot cheaper, so my mother bought the drum. That’s how I started playing drums. I must have been 14 then."

== Career ==
Boudreaux joined The Hawketts as a student at Joseph S. Clark Sr. High School. He said band members would march in the Friday night football games with the Clark High School band, then perform as The Hawketts on Saturday evenings at dances held at the YWCA near Claiborne Avenue and Canal Street Boudreaux recollected that Jack the Cat, a disc jockey at WWEZ, approached the band about recording "Mardi Gras Mambo". "The band used to do calypso/rumba types of stuff because that came off of Professor Longhair's music, so it was easy to go in that direction. ... He had a rumba rhythm with another kind of New Orleans-type drum sound. "Mardi Gras Mambo" wasn't exactly like that, but we were trying to play a calypso-type style." When the song came out in 1954 it was an immediate hit, and has become a perennial Carnival season favorite.

Boudreaux recalled the man who influenced him and so much of New Orleans' music. "The first time I played with Professor Longhair was about 1952. I was never his regular drummer—I just played a few gigs with him. He would never call me to play with him, but he’d have someone else call me. I guess he had other drummers ahead of me. The first place we played was in a little park by the Lafitte Projects. There was me, Fess and Harold Battiste on saxophone."

Considered an influential part of New Orleans' music scene—especially for his fellow drummers—Boudreaux learned and played R&B, jazz, funk and everything in between. Idris Muhammad, a New Orleans drummer who worked in R&B as well as jazz, talked of the sense of musical community that fostered rising musicians' development. "It was a natural thing," he said, "John Boudreaux and Smokey Johnson and I used to practice in my house and they were better drummers. Smokey could play all of Art Blakey's stuff, John could play all of Max Roach's things, and I was just listening. I thought it was unusual that three drummers could play and be such close friends... just trying to play the instrument. John was a perfect single-stroke roller. I learned a lot from these guys." Alvin "Red" Tyler said of young New Orleans musicians influenced by local studio musicians, "They wanted to learn the more modern (jazz) things, because we were the guys around town that, even we were in the studio playing rock, we played all the jazz gigs."

Among the musicians Boudreaux accompanied were Duke Burrell, Dr. John, Charlie Fairlie, Barbara George, Clarence "Frogman" Henry and Professor Longhair. He served for a period as the house drummer at New Orleans's Dew Drop Inn, where he played behind Al Hibbler, Big Joe Turner and Dinah Washington.

== Studio work ==
When first call studio drummer Earl Palmer left town for California in 1957, Charles "Hungry" Williams was the drummer who took his place. In the early 1960s Williams lost his position as the premier drummer in New Orleans to Boudreaux, and dropped out of the recording scene by the time of the British Invasion. Boudreaux became one of the most prolific studio drummers in New Orleans. He spoke of that time, "I got to know Mac Rebennack and he started using me on sessions [for Ric and Ron Records]. The first thing we did might have been Irma Thomas’ "Don’t Mess With My Man". Then there was Professor Longhair’s "Go to the Mardi Gras". Mac was also doing sessions for John Vincent [Ace Records] and he used me on those sessions too. I did quite a bit of work with Mac at the time. Then Allen Toussaint hired me and he started having hits. I played on (Ernie) K-Doe's "Mother-in-Law" and all of his hits. I played on Chris Kenner’s "I Like It Like That" and "Land of a Thousand Dances". I played on Lee Dorsey’s "Ya Ya". Mac Rebennack, also known as Dr. John, said of Boudreaux, "What John Boudreaux was doing on drums deserves a special look. Instead of playing the backbeat on the snare drum, he played all four beats on the snare, a little New Orleans funk cha-cha."

Boudreaux's drum work added much to the sound of a string of Allen Toussaint-produced songs on Minit Records. He worked closely with bassist Chuck Badie on these sessions. Deacon John Moore recalled, "A usual Allen Toussaint session back then was besides me on guitar, Chuck Badie on bass, Red Tyler on baritone, Nat Perrilliat on tenor, Melvin Lastie on trumpet, John Boudreaux on drums. We got paid $50 a man for a four song session." Producer and owner of J&M studios Cosimo Matassa said, "Yeah, John was an accomplished drummer, probably one of the two or three best drummers... he could do whatever needed to be done. Boudreaux joined Harold Battiste, Alvin "Red" Tyler, Roy Montrell, Chuck Badie and Melvin Lastie to form AFO Records. AFO, "All For One", was a group of musicians that came together to find a way for black musicians to hold on to their own music, instead of giving up control to unscrupulous white producers and record company executives. AFO had initial success with Barbara George's "I Know" and Prince La La's "You Put the Hurt on Me". Problems with distributor Juggy Murray of Sue Records precipitated a move to the West Coast by Boudreaux and most of the principal artists involved. They hoped a Los Angeles base would facilitate a more suitable distribution arrangement, but the British Invasion sweeping the country signaled hard times for R&B music and AFO folded. Boudreaux remained in California.

== Later years ==
Boudreaux worked on the West Coast with Alvin "Shine" Robinson, Jessie Hill, Shirley Goodman, Tami Lynn, Plas Johnson, David Lastie, Paul Gayten, King Floyd and others. "A lot of artists from New Orleans went out there trying to get a break", he said. "My family came out right after we [AFO] got here and that kind of made me stay. In the 1960s I was happy with the music and I was staying busy freelancing with a lot of people. There were a lot of heavy cats out there I was working with. Harold (Battiste) got into the production end of the business and he hired me on quite a few sessions. In fact we worked on the early Sonny and Cher recordings." He played in California for a few years with Melvin Lastie and Tami Lynn, and did more session work, with Sam Cooke, Eddie "Lockjaw" Davis, Billy Eckstine, Dexter Gordon, Groove Holmes, Big Mama Thornton and Eddie "Cleanhead" Vinson. Later in his career, he began playing saxophone, marimba, and timpani as well.

John Boudreaux died on January 14, 2017, at age 80 in Los Angeles.
