= One Note at a Time =

British documentary film

- Directed by: Renee Edwards
- Produced by: Paul Woolwich; Craig McCall; Sara Giles
- Starring: Dr. John; Ben Jaffe; Kermit Ruffins; Irma Thomas
- Edited by: Renee Edwards
- Music by: Ray Russell
- Distributed by: Munro Films
- Release dates: 23 October 2016 (New Orleans Film Festival); 24 August 2018
- Running time: 95 minutes
- Countries: United Kingdom; United States
- Language: English

One Note at a Time is a British/American documentary film directed by Renee Edwards. The film follows New Orleans musicians post-Hurricane Katrina. It is dedicated to the late drummer Herman Roscoe Ernest. The film was officially released in the UK and Ireland in 2018 and is due for release in the US and Canada during 2019.

== Background ==
The film explores the relationship between New Orleans, the musicians, the environment, and the American social welfare system that is unable to support them. Many of the musicians live and work in poverty, going from gig to gig, needing to pay for medical and living expenses. The city, at a tipping point when it comes to supporting the musicians, still needs them for its culture and economy. Much screen time is spent with the New Orleans Musicians' Clinic who struggle to provide medical care to artists too well off for Medicaid and too poor to afford Obamacare.

Filmed over a 4-year period, One Note at a Time is a feature-length documentary that follows the lives of the musicians and the difficulties they face. It highlights young musicians and how the gentrification of the city has brought with it new sound pollution laws, which impact the 24-hour party culture the city has enjoyed.

== Featured artists ==
One Note at a Time captures new and last interviews with a number of musicians and artist as it tracks them over a 4-year period. Notable musicians featured include: Dr. John, Ben Jaffe, Kermit Ruffins, Charmaine Neville, Al "Carnival Time" Johnson, Ellis Marsalis Jr., Barry Martyn, Herman "Roscoe" Ernest III, Wardell Quezergue, Irma Thomas, Clarke Peters, Donald Harrison, and Delfeayo Marsalis.

== Release ==
The film was screened at film and music festivals in the UK, Germany and the US in 2017, receiving a number of accolades. The official release by UK and Ireland distributor Munro Films was August 24, 2018, where the film was screened in UK cinemas. The digital film was released on September 3, 2018. The official soundtrack containing a unique live recorded track by New Orleans' icon Dr John was released worldwide by Louisiana Red Hot Records on August 24, 2018. US and Canada digital release by The Golden Media Group, began on April 14, 2019.

== Soundtrack ==
No.	Artist	LengthTitle	Length
1	Bicycle Ballad Sam	Touch The Hem Of His Garment (Live)	00:21
2	Dr. John	If Musicians Ain't Got A Chance To Live	00:08
3	The Hot 8 Brass Band	Let me Do My Thing (Remix)	08:25
4	Kermit Ruffins	It Was A Blessing	00:16
5	Ray Russell	What The Future Brings	01:20
6	Damion Neville and The Charmaine Neville Band	Papa Was A Rolling Stone (Live)	04:51
7	Felice Guilmont	Everybody's Gone	00:13
8	Felice Guilmont	Higher	04:06
9	Chip Wilson and Jesse Moore	Slip Away	03:04
10	Shelton "Shakespear" Alexander	Second Lining (Live)	01:09
11	To Be Continued Brass Band	Ray Nagin (Give Me My Projects Back)	07:45
12	To Be Continued Brass Band	We're Not Criminals	00:19
13	New Orleans Ragtime Orchestra	I Wish I Could Shimmy Like My Sister Kate (Live)	05:17
14	Irma Thomas	Just Passing Through	00:14
15	Bud Tower	Please Don't Take Me Home	05:01
16	Ms Pearl	Summertime (Live)	00:36
17	Walter Payton, Jr.	Touched Somebody	00:24
18	Cliff Hines	Tehran	06:04
19	Ben Jaffe	Die A Healthy Man	00:23
20	Dr. John	Proper Fitting Way	00:24
21	Dr. John	Roscoes Song / Down The Road (Live)	09:54
22	Ray Russel	One Note at a Time	02:15
23	Barry Martyn	To Hell With The Girls	00:31
24	Barry Martyn	Down By The Riverside	04:20
25	Al "Carnival Time" Johnson	Carnival Time	02:41
26	Ben Jaffe	A Place I've Never Seen Before	00:20
27	Uptown Jazz Orchestra	Blue Monk (Live)	01:14
28	Kermit Ruffins	New Orleans People	00:19
29	Dr. John, Gaynielle Neville, Cyril Neville, Amasi Miller, Shannon Powell, Jesse Boyd, Detroit Brooks, Paul Pattan & Donald Harrison Jr.	This Little Light of Mine (Live)	01:32
30	Ray Russell	From The Heart (Digital Bonus Track)	02:49
31	Gypsy Elise And The Royal Blues	Funky Tribe (Digital Bonus Track)	04:39

== Awards ==
The film has won international and domestic festival awards, including:

- Best Feature Documentary – Studio City International Film Festival (2017)
- Gold Winner – Los Angeles Film Review Industry Awards (2017)
- Best Documentary – Nottingham International Film Festival (2017)
- Film of the Festival – Oxford International Film Festival (2017)
- Best Feature Documentary – Oxford International Film Festival (2017)
- Best Score – Oxford International Film Festival (2017)
