= The Fascinations =

American pop vocal group

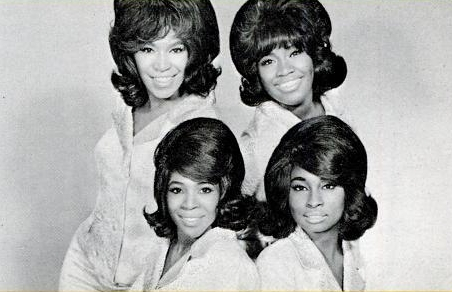
- The group in 1967

Background information
- Genres: Pop, R&B
- Years active: 1960–1971
- Labels: ABC-Paramount, Mayfield Records
- Past members: Bernadine Boswell; Joanne Boswell; Fern Bledsoe; Martha Reeves; Shirley Lawson

The Fascinations were an American pop vocal group most active in the mid-1960s. They are best remembered for the Curtis Mayfield-penned hit "Girls Are Out to Get You", a minor pop hit in the US in 1967 that was re-released in the UK in 1971, where it reached the top 40.

== History ==
=== Early years (1960–1963) ===
The group was formed in 1960 by Shirley Lawson and Martha Reeves, who originally planned on calling their group the Sabre-ettes. Sisters Joanne and Bernadine Boswell joined the group through an audition process. Fern Bledsoe joined the group right around the time they changed their name to the Fasinations.

Before the group got its chance at recording, in late 1960 founding member Reeves left over disagreements with the other members. Reeves went on to re-join her previous group, the Del-Phis. This group signed to the Motown Records label, and later became Martha & The Vandellas. Bernadette Boswell would be the Fas(c)inations' lead singer from this point on.

In late 1962, the Fasinations were signed to the ABC-Paramount label. There they met Curtis Mayfield (of the Impressions) who wrote and produced their first single, "Mama Didn't Lie", a track he had previously cut with Jan Bradley. While the track was initially issued as by the Fasinations, the group quickly changed their name to the more conventionally spelled "The Fascinations", and subsequent pressings of this single (and all future singles) were accordingly credited to the Fascinations.

Bradley's version of "Mama Didn't Lie" had been a regional hit, but had not broken nationally when the Fascinations recorded their version. However, Bradley's recording of "Mama" began to take off nationally just as the Fascinations released their record. As it turned out, Bradley's recording of "Mama Didn't Lie" entered the Billboard chart in the first week of 1963, while the Fascinations version of the same song debuted in the "Bubbling Under" charts one week later. Bradley took "Mama Didn't Lie" all the way to number 14 while the Fascinations' version stalled at number 108. The group then followed up with "Tears in My Eyes", which flopped, and ABC dropped them from their label roster.

=== Hiatus (1964–1965) ===
The Fascinations continued to rehearse and make club appearances over the next few years, but also had to take on other jobs to make ends meet. Bledsoe worked as a secretary at Motown Records, and also sang lead on two 1964 singles by obscure girl-group the Aprils (the second credited to "Fern and the Aprils").

White, under the name "Shirley Lawson", also issued two obscure solo singles during these years.

=== Return to recording (1966–1968) ===
After a gap of a few years, the Fascinations found themselves back in the studio with Curtis Mayfield — when Mayfield started his Mayfield Records label in 1966, one of the first acts he signed was The Fascinations. Their first single for that label was "Say It Isn't So"/"I'm So Lucky", taking its style from Motown. While the record did not make the Hot 100 chart, it was a hit on the R&B chart, eventually landing in the Top 50.

Mayfield also wrote and produced their next single, "Girls Are Out to Getcha," which was their most commercially successful song: it reached number 92 on the Billboard Hot 100, and on the R&B chart it climbed to number 13.

In mid-1967 the group's third Mayfield single, "I'm In Love," produced in similar fashion to "Girls Are Out to Getcha", became the group's third Top 50 single on the R&B chart. However, the group's follow-up release of "Hold On"/"Such a Fool" went virtually unnoticed, as did the Fascinations' final release on the Mayfield label, "Just Another Reason"/"Okay for You". The Mayfield label closed up shop with this release and Curtis Mayfield would have more success with his next label, Curtom.

In early 1968, label-less and with bookings for live appearances dwindling, the Fascinations decided to retire.

=== UK success, and a brief reunion (1971) ===
The group reunited briefly in 1971, after their 1966 single "Girls Are Out to Get You" became popular in England as a part of the Northern soul movement. Upon re-issue on the Polydor Records subsidiary Mojo label, "Girls Are Out to Get You" reached number 32 in the UK Singles Chart in 1971, and the Fascinations took advantage of this unexpected resurgence in their popularity and reformed for their first overseas tour. They have not reformed since.

== Members ==
- Bernadine Boswell (Smith)
- Joanne Boswell (Leavell)
- Fern Bledsoe
- Martha Reeves (early 1960 only)
- Shirley Lawson

== Discography ==
=== Singles ===
Year	Title	Chart positions		
Year	Title	US Hot 100	US R&B	UK
1962	"Mama Didn't Lie"	108	—	—
1963	"Tears in My Eyes"	—	—	—
1966	"Say It Isn't So"	—	47	—
1966	"Girls Are Out to Get You"	92	13	—
1967	"I'm in Love" / "I Can't Stay Away from You"	—	47	—
1967	"Hold On"	—	—	—
1967	"Just Another Reason"	—	—	—
1971	"Girls Are Out to Get You" (UK-only reissue)	—	—	32
1971	"I'm So Lucky" (UK-only; initially released in 1966 as a B-side)	—	—	—
"—" denotes releases that did not chart.

=== Compilation album ===
- ...Out to Getcha (1997, Sequel Records)
