= Steve Mann (American guitarist) =

American musician (1943–2009)

- Mann in 1967

Background information
- Birth name: Steven Mann
- Born: May 2, 1943
- Died: September 9, 2009 (aged 66); Berkeley, California, U.S.
- Genres: Folk
- Occupations: Musician; songwriter
- Instruments: Guitar; vocals

Steven Mann (May 2, 1943 – September 9, 2009) was an American guitarist based in California. He was known for his fingerpicking style.

== History ==
Mann broke onto the West Coast music scene in the early 1960s. As a student at Valley State College in Los Angeles, Mann began to perform folk music at hootenannies and Los Angeles clubs like The Ash Grove and The Troubadour. He became friends with numerous artists on the folk music scene, including Hoyt Axton, Judy Henske, Gale Garnett, Jimmy Rubin, Jorma Kaukonen, and Terry Wadsworth (who later joined The New Christy Minstrels). In 1962, Mann was introduced to a young singer named Janis Joplin at an open mic performance at The Troubadour. Mann began accompanying Joplin on guitar, and the two performed at open mics in the Los Angeles area. They stopped performing together when Mann temporarily relocated to San Francisco. While in San Francisco, Mann also met singer/songwriter Ivan Ulz with whom he co-wrote two songs, one of which was recorded by Rod McKuen.

Around 1967, Mann went into partial retirement due to struggles with mental illness. His few recordings became collector's items and his music became legendary among blues guitar aficionados. In 2003, Mann moved to Berkeley, California, where he began to perform again with the help of friends Will Scarlett and Janet Smith of Bella Roma Music. In 2005, Mann released a new album on CD, Steve Mann: Alive and Pickin', which featured re-releases of previously recorded material, including performances with Janis Joplin, as well as a new song written and performed by Mann.

In July 2009, the studio master tape of Straight Life was provided by John Lyon who had protected it from destruction since the 1970s. The tape has been digitized and re-released on CD by Bella Roma Music. Mann died on September 9, 2009, in Berkeley, California.

== Discography ==
- Steve Mann: Alive and Pickin', Bella Roma Music, 2005
- Steve Mann Live at the Ash Grove, Bella Roma Music, reissued 2005 (originally released 1975)
- Steve Mann: Straight Life, 2009, Bella Roma Music
