= Jessie Hill =

American musical artist (1932–1996)

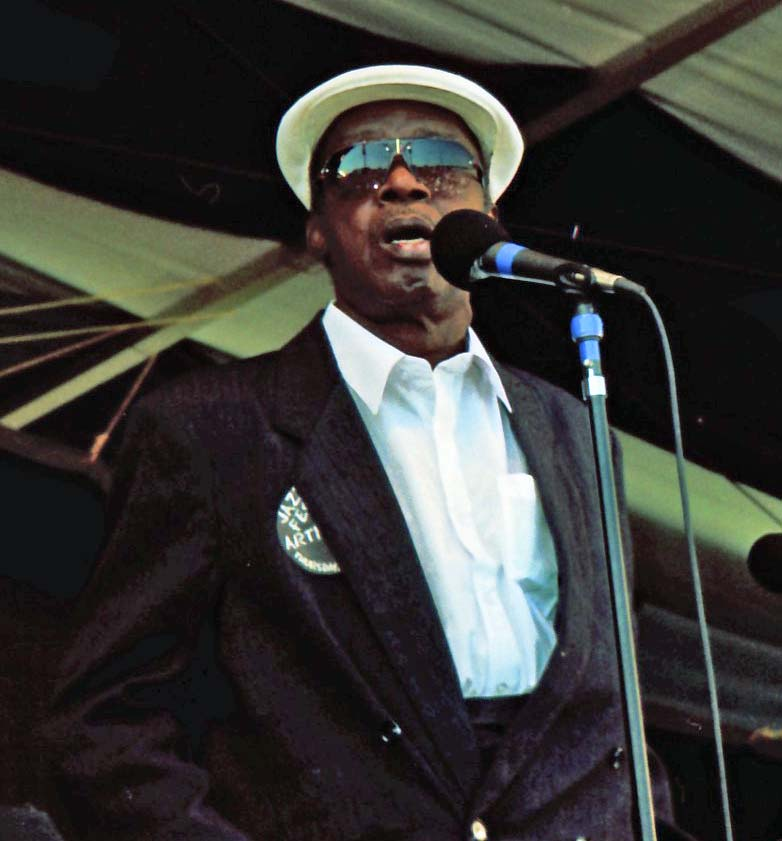
- Jessie Hill at New Orleans Jazz & Heritage Festival, 1996.

Background information
- Born: December 9, 1932; New Orleans, Louisiana, United States
- Died: September 17, 1996 (aged 63) New Orleans, Louisiana, US
- Genres: R&B; Louisiana blues
- Occupations: Singer, songwriter
- Instrument: Vocals
- Years active: 1951–1996
- Labels: Minit; Downey; Kerwood; Wand; Chess; Pulsar; Blue Thumb

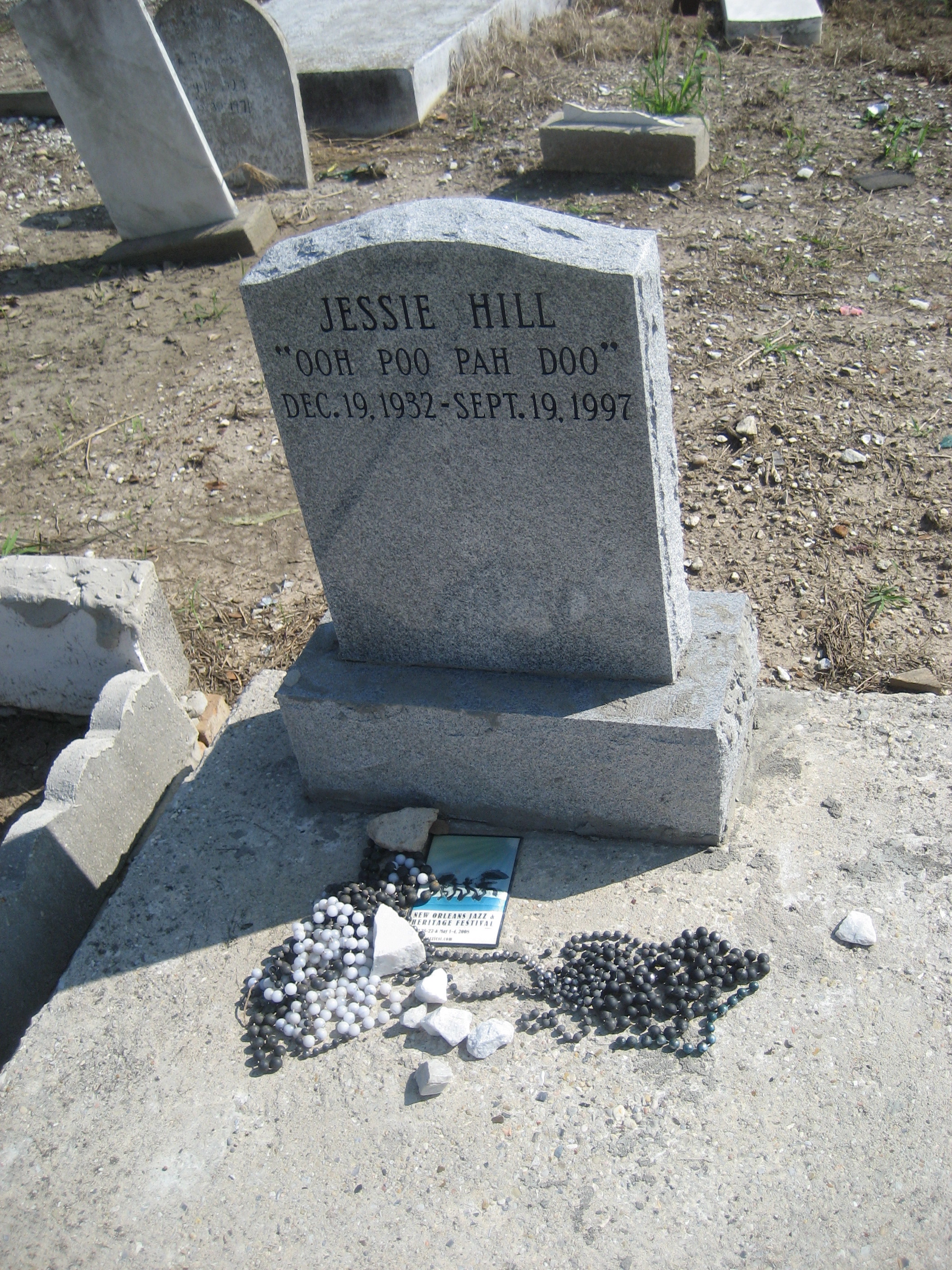
Hill's tombstone

Jessie Hill (December 9, 1932 – September 17, 1996) was an American R&B and Louisiana blues singer and songwriter, best remembered for the classic song "Ooh Poo Pah Doo".

== Life and career ==
Hill was born in New Orleans, Louisiana, United States. By his teens, he was playing drums in local bands, and in 1951 he formed his own group, the House Rockers. After periods performing as drummer with Professor Longhair and then Huey "Piano" Smith, Hill formed a new version of the House Rockers in 1958, which enabled him to focus on singing with the band. He is the grandfather of James and Troy Andrews.

The origins of "Ooh Poo Pah Doo" were apparently created from a tune played by a local pianist, who was known only as Big Four. Hill wrote the lyrics and melody, later expanding the work with an intro taken from Dave Bartholomew. It was further honed on stage, before Hill recorded a demo that he shopped to local record labels, finally recording a session at Cosimo Matassa's studio produced by Allen Toussaint.

Upon its 1960 release on Minit Records, "Ooh Poo Pah Doo" emerged as a favorite at Mardi Gras, selling 800,000 copies and reaching number 3 on the Billboard R&B chart and number 28 in the Billboard Hot 100 pop chart. There have been over 100 cover versions of "Ooh Poo Pah Doo" recorded and performed live over the years by other popular musicians, most notably The Shirelles and Ike and Tina Turner.

His follow-up "Whip It On Me" reached number 91 on the Billboard Hot 100 in 1960. Further recordings in New Orleans were less successful, and he moved to California to work with fellow New Orleans musicians including Harold Battiste and Mac Rebennack. In this period, he wrote songs recorded by Ike and Tina Turner, Sonny and Cher, and Willie Nelson.

A 1971 solo album on Blue Thumb was unsuccessful, and he began to suffer financial difficulties exacerbated by a drinking problem. These problems continued after his return to New Orleans in 1977, and several benefit gigs did little to revive his personal or professional fortunes.

== Death ==
Hill died of heart and renal failure in New Orleans on September 17, 1996, at the age of 63. He is buried in Holt Cemetery in New Orleans.

== Family members ==
Two of Hill's grandsons are James Andrews and Troy "Trombone Shorty" Andrews. The pair performed "Ooh Poo Pah Doo" in Episode 7 of the HBO series Treme. A third grandson, Travis "Trumpet Black" Hill, was a rising New Orleans–based performer who died from a tooth infection while on tour in Tokyo on May 4, 2015.

Walter "Papoose" Nelson, best known as Fats Domino's guitar player, was his brother-in-law. Lois Nelson Andrews, a New Orleans 6th Ward cultural icon dubbed as the Queen of the Tremé, was Hill's daughter.

== Discography ==
=== Singles ===
Year	Title	Peak chart positions		Record Label	Album	B-side
Year	Title	US Pop	US R&B	Record Label	Album	B-side
1960	"Ooh Poo Pah Doo Part 1"	28	3	Minit		"Ooh Poo Pah Doo Part 2"
1960	"Whip It on Me"	91	—	Minit		"I Need Your Love"
1960	"Scoop Scoobie Doobie"	—	—	Minit		"Highhead Blues"
1961	"I Got Mine"	—	—	Minit		"Oh Me Oh My"
1961	"My Love"	—	—	Minit		"Oogsey Moo"
1961	"It's My Fault"	—	—	Minit		"Sweet Jelly Roll"
1962	"Can’t Get Enough (Of That Ooh Poo Pah Doo)"	—	—	Minit		"The Pot's on a Strike"
1964	"Chip Chop (My Fair Lady)"	—	—	Downey		"Woodshed"
1964	"Understanding"	—	—	Downey		"Down the Street"
1964	"Never Thought"	—	—	Downey		"T.V. Guide"
1965	"I'm Telling You People"	—	—	Kerwood		"If I Am Lucky"
1967	"My Children, My Children"	—	—	Chess		"Something Ought to Be Done (About You)"
1969	"Free and Easy"	—	—	Pulsar		"Mardi Gras"
1971	"Naturally"	—	—	Blue Thumb	Naturally	"Livin’ a Lie"

== See also ==
- Trombone Shorty
- Tremé neighborhood in New Orleans, Louisiana
