= Ronnie Barron =

American actor & musician (1943–1997)

- Born: Ronald Raymond Barrosse; October 9, 1943; Algiers, New Orleans, U.S.
- Died: March 20, 1997 (aged 53)
- Occupations: Actor; musician; singer
- Instruments: Keyboards; organ; vocals
- Years active: 1970s–1997

Ronnie Barron (born Ronald Raymond Barrosse, October 9, 1943, in Algiers, New Orleans – March 20, 1997) was an American actor, musician, and blue-eyed soul singer during the 1970s. He was known for his work as a session musician, and a sideman for several artists, as well as his collaborations with Dr. John, a fellow New Orleans native.

Musicians who employed him include Paul Butterfield, Canned Heat, Ry Cooder, Tom Waits, Eric Burdon & the Animals, Delaney & Bonnie and Friends, and others.

Barron met Mac Rebennack in 1958 and performed with him at several venues around New Orleans. They were classmates at Jesuit High School in New Orleans. During that period, he created the Reverend Ether persona to satisfy audiences who were primarily interested in entertainers. Rebennack was so impressed with the gimmick that he wanted Barron to become Dr. John. Barron was hired by Sonny and Cher in 1965, and relocated to California to become a session musician, and left the Reverend Ether character behind.

He was married to Linda Kelly and had two children, Ronald Raymond, Jr. and Ava. He died in 1997 from complications of heart problems.

== Discography ==
- "Morgus The Magnificent" / "The Lonely Boy" (Vin Records 1013, Apr 1959) as Morgus and the Ghouls
- "Bad Neighborhood" / "Keeps Dragging Me On" (JC Records 1000, Apr 1962) as Ronnie and the Delinquents
- "The Hip Parade" / "It's All In the Past" (Soundex Records 604, Feb 1963)
- "Talk That Talk, Part 1" / "Talk That Talk, Part 2" (Another Record 100, 1963) as Drits and Dravy
- "The Grass Looks Greener Yonder" / "Did She Mention My Name" (Michelle 933, 1964)
- "1862 B.P." / "48 Hours" (et cet'er-a rec'ords 201, 1970) as Rev. Ether, The Kingdom, The Power and The Glory
- Reverend Ether (Decca Records DL-75303, 1971)
- The Smile of Life (Better Days/Nippon Columbia YX-7201-N, 1978)
- Blue Delicacies (Sunshine Records SPD-1023, 1979)
- Bon Ton Roulette (Ace Records CH-79, 1983)

== Filmography ==
Year	Title	Role	Notes
1978	Stony Island	Ronnie Roosevelt	
1985	Code of Silence	Doc	
1986	Playing for Keeps	Executive #6	
1988	Above the Law	CIA Bartender	Final film role
