= Tami Lynn =

American soul singer (1939–2020)

Background information
- Also known as: Tamiya Lynn; Tamie Rink
- Born: Gloria Jean Brown; January 25, 1939; Gert Town, New Orleans, Louisiana, United States
- Died: June 26, 2020 (aged 81) New Port Richey, Florida, U.S.
- Genres: Soul, R&B
- Years active: 1965–2020
- Labels: AFO Records, Mojo Records, Atlantic Records

Tami Lynn (born Gloria Jean Brown; January 25, 1939 – June 26, 2020) was an American soul singer. She scored a Top Ten hit on the UK Singles Chart in 1971 with the song "I'm Gonna Run Away From You".

== Career ==
Gloria Brown was born in Gert Town, New Orleans, Louisiana. She attended school with Allen Toussaint and Ellis Marsalis Jr., and sang in church choirs, and with visiting groups such as the Clara Ward Singers, as well as in a school production of Show Boat. She also sang gospel music on WMRY radio shows, and after substituting for an absent performer and being discovered by local musician Alvin "Red" Tyler, began performing rhythm and blues songs in local clubs. Taking the stage name Tami Lynn, she was heard by Allen Toussaint and Harold Battiste, signed for AFO Records, and toured with other company artists, before singing in New York City as an opening act for John Coltrane, Miles Davis and Ella Fitzgerald.

Jerry Wexler heard Lynn sing at a convention in 1965. Wexler had her record the Bert Berns penned and produced song, "I'm Gonna Run Away From You", for Atco Records, but the song was not released at the time, although it was released in the UK on Atlantic (AT.4071). In 1971, "I'm Gonna Run Away From You" was released as a single, with "The Boy Next Door" as the B-side, on Mojo and Atlantic, where it became a hit in the UK among devotees of Northern soul. The tune hit number 4 in the UK Singles Chart in 1971. A full-length album, Love Is Here and Now You're Gone, followed in 1972, produced by John Abbey, and was reissued on CD in 2005 by DBK Works.

Lynn occasionally worked as a backup singer. She sang on many of Dr. John's albums, and the musician put her in contact with the Rolling Stones with whom she sang on Exile on Main St.. She also recorded with King Floyd, Wilson Pickett, and Sonny & Cher, and performed with other musicians including Miles Davis, Irma Thomas and Joe Cocker. "I'm Gonna Run Away From You" returned to the UK Singles Chart in 1975 after being reissued, hitting number 36 the second time around. Following the song's success, Lynn toured with Dr. John. Another album was the 1992 funk CD, Tamiya Lynn. In 2008, she appeared at the Ponderosa Stomp.

Lynn lived in New York City for many years, before moving to Florida. In 2014, she performed in concert at New Port Richey, Florida, with guitarist Matthew Colthup.

She died in Florida on June 26, 2020.

== Discography ==
- Love Is Here and Now You're Gone (1972, reissued 2005)
- Tamiya Lynn (1992)
