= Harold Battiste =

American musical artist (1931–2015)

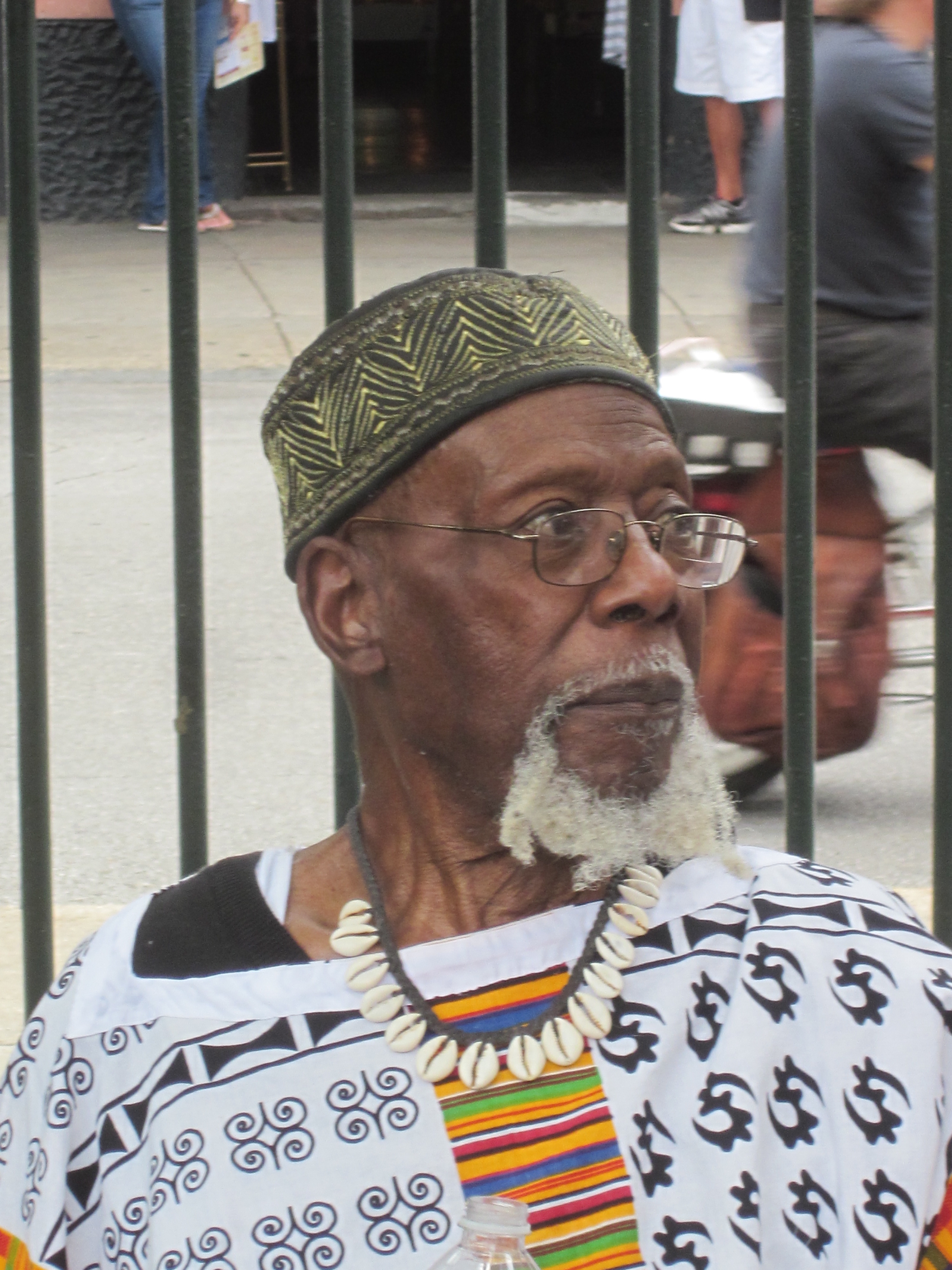
- Battiste in 2012

Background information
- Born: Harold Raymond Battiste Jr. October 28, 1931; New Orleans, Louisiana, U.S.
- Died: June 19, 2015 (aged 83) New Orleans, Louisiana, U.S.
- Genres: R&B, jazz
- Occupations: Musician, arranger, record producer
- Instruments: Saxophone, piano
- Years active: 1957–2015

Harold Raymond Battiste Jr. (October 28, 1931 – June 19, 2015) was an American music composer, arranger, performer, and teacher. A native of, and later community leader in, New Orleans, he is best known for his work as an arranger on records by Barbara George, Sam Cooke, Joe Jones, Lee Dorsey, Sonny and Cher, Dr. John, and others.

== Biography ==
Born in New Orleans, Louisiana, United States, he grew up in the Magnolia Projects. He attended Dillard University, earning a B.S. in music in 1953 and becoming a proficient saxophonist, pianist, and arranger. He formed his first group, with Alvin Batiste (clarinet) and Edward Blackwell (drums) while at university.

His first success as a studio arranger was with Sam Cooke’s "You Send Me" in 1957. In 1961, he initiated the first African American musician-owned record label in the American South, All For One, better known as AFO Records. Within a few months, they produced a million-selling hit single, Barbara George’s "I Know (You Don't Love Me No More)" (AFO#302). The label also released the first album by Ellis Marsalis, The Monkey Puzzle. Battiste's other professional contributions as a producer and arranger for studio, film, stage and television include Joe Jones' "You Talk Too Much", Lee Dorsey's "Ya Ya", and Sonny and Cher's "I Got You Babe". Battiste introduced audiences to New Orleans artist Mac Rebennack as Dr. John, and produced his earliest albums.

Battiste spent 30 years in Los Angeles, including 15 years with Sonny and Cher, earning six gold records, and acting as musical director on their TV series. He also played piano for Tom Waits's songs "Whistlin' Past The Graveyard" and "A Sweet Little Bullet from a Pretty Blue Gun" on Blue Valentine (1978), and baritone saxophone on Gram Parson's 1973 album, GP.

Battiste was also a lecturer at several colleges, and in 1989, he joined Ellis Marsalis Jr. on the Jazz Studies faculty of the University of New Orleans. He established the AFO Foundation, a non-profit service and educational organization, dedicated to recognizing, perpetuating and documenting the heritage of New Orleans music, and the people who make the music.

Battiste remained active in the community, and served as a board member of the Congo Square Cultural Collective, the Louisiana State Music Commission, New Orleans Jazz and Heritage Foundation, Louisiana Jazz Federation, the African Cultural Endowment and numerous other cultural organizations. He received the Beau Arts Award, the Mayor's Arts Award, the Governor's Arts Lifetime Achievement Award and many others. In 1998, the City of New Orleans proclaimed his birthday as Harold Battiste Day. In 2010 the Historic New Orleans Collection published his autobiography Unfinished Blues.

Battiste died on June 19, 2015, aged 83, after a period of declining health.

== Bibliography ==
- Battiste, Harold Jr. (2010). Unfinished Blues...Memories of a New Orleans Music Man. The Historic New Orleans Collection. ISBN 978-0917860553.
