= Dr. John =

American singer (1941–2019)

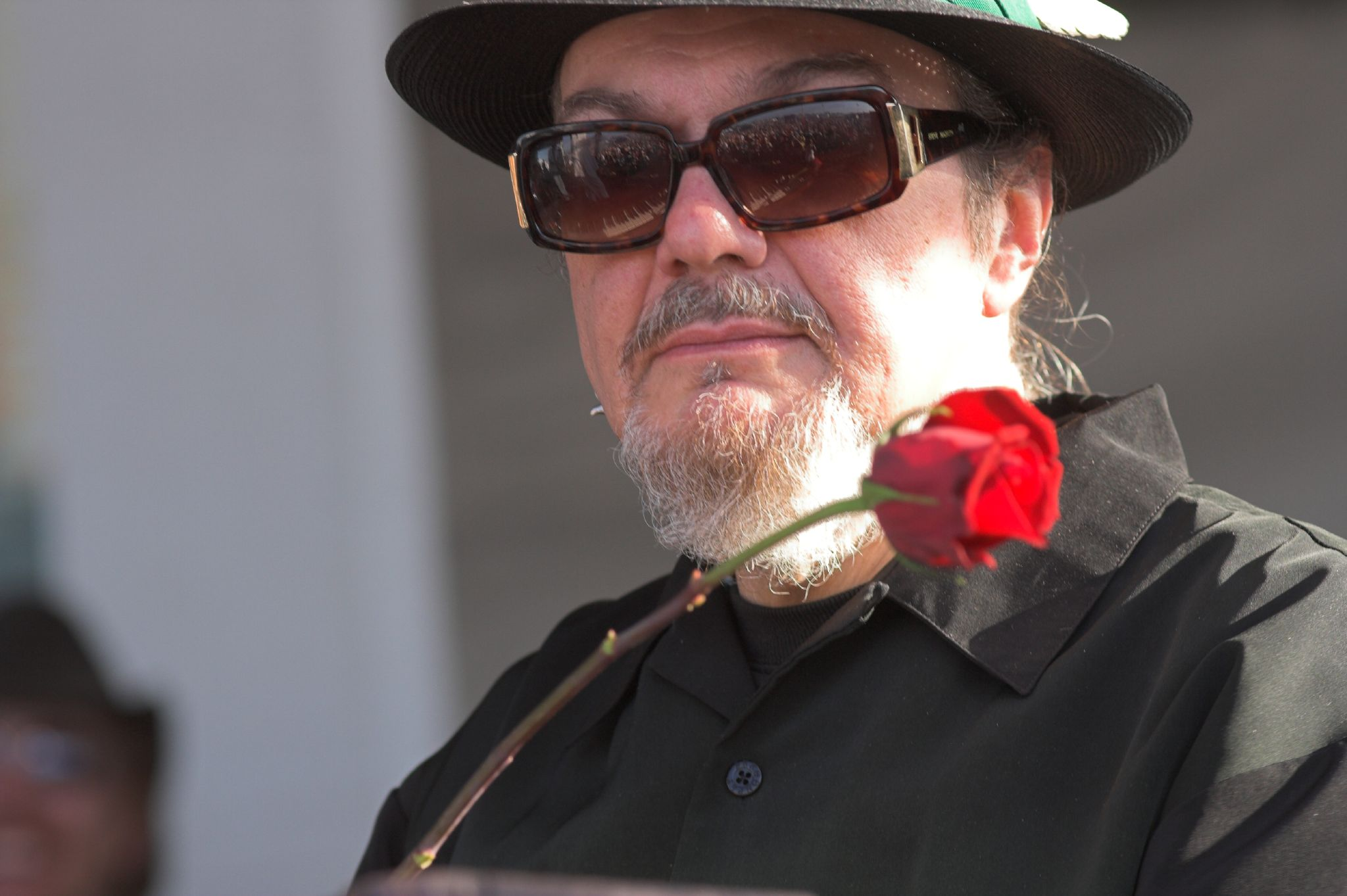
- Dr. John at the 2007 New Orleans Jazz & Heritage Festival

Background information
- Also known as: Mac Rebennack; Dr. John Creaux; Dr. John the Night Tripper
- Born: Malcolm John Rebennack Jr. November 20, 1941; New Orleans, Louisiana, U.S.
- Died: June 6, 2019 (aged 77) New Orleans, Louisiana, U.S.
- Genres: Blues; jazz; R&B; soul; funk; blues rock; swamp rock
- Occupations: Singer; musician; songwriter
- Instruments: Vocals; piano; guitar
- Years active: 1950s–2019
- Labels: Atco; Blue Note; Nonesuch; Concord; Proper
- Formerly of: The Wrecking Crew; Ringo Starr & His All-Starr Band
- Website: nitetripper.com

Malcolm John Rebennack Jr. (November 20, 1941 – June 6, 2019), better known by his stage name Dr. John, was an American singer, songwriter and pianist. His music combined New Orleans blues, jazz, R&B, soul and funk.

Active as a session musician from the late 1950s until his death, he gained a following in the late 1960s after the release of his album Gris-Gris (1968) and his appearance at the Bath Festival of Blues and Progressive Music (1970). He typically performed a lively, theatrical stage show inspired by medicine shows, Mardi Gras costumes, and voodoo ceremonies. Rebennack recorded thirty studio albums and nine live albums, as well as contributing to thousands of other musicians' recordings. In 1973, he achieved a top-10 hit single with "Right Place, Wrong Time".

He was inducted into the Rock and Roll Hall of Fame in 2011.

== Early life and career ==
Rebennack was born in New Orleans, Louisiana, on November 20, 1941. He was the son of Dorothy (née Cronin) and Malcolm John Rebennack, and had German, Irish, Spanish, English, and French heritage. His father ran an appliance shop in the East End of New Orleans, fixing radios and televisions and selling records. Growing up in the 3rd Ward of New Orleans, he found early musical inspiration in the minstrel show tunes sung by his grandfather and a number of aunts, uncles, sister, and cousins who played piano. He did not take music lessons before his teens and endured only a short stint in choir before getting kicked out. When Rebennack was a young boy, his father exposed him to jazz musicians King Oliver and Louis Armstrong, who later inspired his 2014 release, Ske-Dat-De-Dat: The Spirit of Satch. Throughout his adolescence, his father's connections enabled him access to the recording rooms of rock artists, including Little Richard and Guitar Slim. Later he began to perform in New Orleans clubs, mainly on guitar, and played on stage with various local artists.

When he was about 13 years old, Rebennack met Professor Longhair. Impressed by the professor's flamboyant attire and striking musical style, Rebennack soon began performing with him, and began his life as a professional musician. He later recalled that his debut in the studio, in about 1955 or 1956, came when he was signed as a songwriter and artist by Eddie Mesner at Aladdin Records. He joined the musicians' union at the end of 1957, with the help of Danny Kessler, and then considered himself to be a professional musician.

At age 16, Rebennack was hired by Johnny Vincent as a producer at Ace Records. There, he gained experience working with many artists, including James Booker, Earl King, and Jimmy Clanton. While a struggling student at Jesuit High School, he was already playing in night clubs, something the Jesuit fathers disapproved of. He formed his first band, The Dominoes, while at the school. The priests told him to either stop playing in clubs or leave the school. Rebennack was expelled from the high school in 1954 and from then on focused entirely on music.

In late 1950s New Orleans, Rebennack led his own band, Mac Rebennack and the Skyliners, (Paul Staehle/Dennis "Bootsie" Cuquet, drums; Earl Stanley, bass; Charlie Miller, trumpet; Charlie Maduell, sax; Roland "Stone" LeBlanc, vocals), while playing gigs with others, including Frankie Ford and the Thunderbirds, and Jerry Byrne and the Loafers. His first (co-written) rock and roll song "Lights Out" (1957), sung by Jerry Byrne, was a regional hit. He had a regional hit with a Bo Diddley-influenced instrumental called "Storm Warning" on Rex Records in 1959. At A&R, he and Charlie Miller recorded monophonic singles on 45s for Johnny Vincent and Joe Ruffino for local labels Ace, Ric, and Ron. He oversaw the rhythm section while Miller wrote the horn arrangements and headed up the horns. This continued until Miller moved to New York to study music formally.

Rebennack's career as a guitarist was stunted around 1960, when the ring finger on his left (guitar fretting) hand was injured by a gunshot during an incident at a Jacksonville, Florida gig. After the injury, Rebennack concentrated on bass guitar before making piano his main instrument, developing a style influenced by Professor Longhair.

Rebennack became involved in illegal activities in New Orleans, using and selling narcotics and running a brothel. He was arrested on drug charges and sentenced to two years in the Federal Correctional Institution, Fort Worth. His sentence ended in 1965 and he left for Los Angeles.

Once settled in Los Angeles he became a "first call" session musician in the Los Angeles studio scene in the 1960s and 1970s and was part of "The Wrecking Crew" stable of studio musicians. He provided backing for Sonny & Cher (and some of the incidental music for Cher's first film, Chastity), for Canned Heat on their albums Living the Blues (1968) and Future Blues (1970), and for Frank Zappa and the Mothers of Invention on Freak Out! (1966).

== Voodoo influence ==
As a young man, Rebennack was interested in New Orleans voodoo, and in Los Angeles he developed the idea of the Dr. John persona for his old friend Ronnie Barron, based on the life of Dr. John, a Senegalese prince, conjure man, herb doctor, and spiritual healer who came to New Orleans from Haiti. This free man of color lived on Bayou Road and claimed to have 15 wives and over 50 children. He kept an assortment of snakes and lizards, along with embalmed scorpions and animal and human skulls, and sold gris-gris, voodoo amulets which supposedly protect the wearer from harm.

Rebennack decided to produce a record and a stage show based on this concept, with Dr. John serving as an emblem of New Orleans heritage. Although initially, the plan was for Barron to front the act assuming the identity of "Dr. John", while Rebennack worked behind the scenes as Dr. John's writer, musician, and producer, this did not come to pass. Barron dropped out of the project, and Rebennack took over the role (and identity) of Dr. John. Gris-Gris became the name of Dr. John's debut album, released in January 1968, representing his own form of "voodoo medicine".

== 1968–1971: Dr. John, the Night Tripper ==
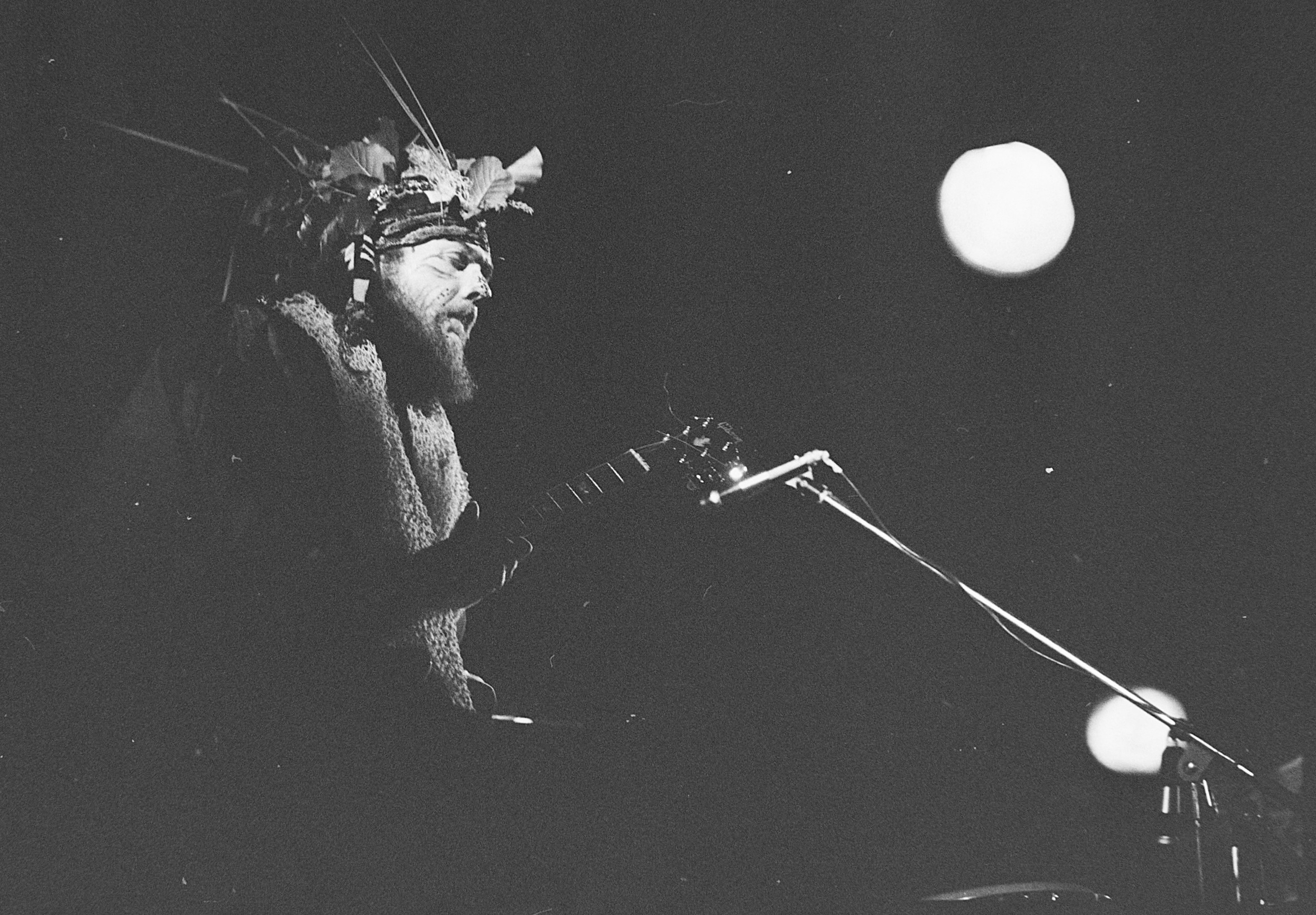
Dr. John, the Night Tripper at Kralingen 1970

Beginning in the late 1960s, Rebennack gained fame as a solo artist after adopting the persona of "Dr. John, The Night Tripper". Dr. John's act combined New Orleans-style rhythm and blues with psychedelic rock and elaborate stage shows that bordered on voodoo religious ceremonies, including elaborate costumes and headdress. In 1970, when Howard Smith asked him where the name "Dr. John the Night Tripper" came from, he responded, "Before that I was Professor Bizarre. Cats used to call me things like "Bishop" or "Governor" or somethin' but they started callin' me "Doctor" for a while, so I just hung it on myself for keeps." On the earliest Dr. John records, the artist billing was "Dr. John, The Night Tripper", while the songwriting credits billed him as "Dr. John Creaux". Within a few years, the "Night Tripper" subtitle was dropped, and Rebennack resumed using his real name for writing and producing/arranging credits.

Gris-Gris, his 1968 debut album combining voodoo rhythms and chants with the New Orleans music tradition, was ranked 143rd on Rolling Stone's "The 500 Greatest Albums of All Time" list. Three more albums, Babylon (1969), Remedies (1970) and The Sun, Moon & Herbs (1971), were released in the same vein as Gris-Gris.

During early to mid-1969, Dr. John toured extensively, backed by supporting musicians Richard "Didymus" Washington (congas), Richard Crooks (drums), David L. Johnson (bass), Gary Carino (guitar), and singers Eleanor Barooshian, Jeanette Jacobs from The Cake, and Sherry Graddie. A second lineup formed later in the year for an extensive tour of the East Coast with Crooks and Johnson joined by Doug Hastings (guitar) and Don MacAllister (mandolin). The same year, Dr. John contributed to the Music from Free Creek "supersession" project, playing on three tracks with Eric Clapton. Washington and Crooks also contributed to the project.

By the time The Sun, Moon & Herbs was released, he had gained a notable cult following, which included artists such as Eric Clapton and Mick Jagger, who both took part in the sessions for that album. This album served as a transition from his Night Tripper voodoo, psychedelic persona to one more closely associated with traditional New Orleans R&B and funk. His next album, Dr. John's Gumbo, with drummer Fred Staehle serving as the band's backbone, proved to be a landmark recording and is one of his most popular to this day.

== 1972–1974: Gumbo, In the Right Place, and Desitively Bonnaroo ==
Along with Gris-Gris, Dr. John is perhaps best known for his recordings in the period 1972–74. 1972's Dr. John's Gumbo, an album covering several New Orleans R&B standards with only one original, is considered a cornerstone of New Orleans music. In his 1994 autobiography, Under a Hoodoo Moon, Dr. John writes, "In 1972, I recorded Gumbo, an album that was both a tribute to and my interpretation of the music I had grown up with in New Orleans in the late 1940s and 1950s. I tried to keep a lot of little changes that were characteristic of New Orleans, while working my own funknology on piano and guitar." The lead single from the album, "Iko Iko", broke into the Billboard Hot 100 singles chart, eventually reaching No. 71. In 2003 the album was ranked number 404 on Rolling Stone magazine's list of the 500 greatest albums of all time.

With Gumbo, Dr. John expanded his career beyond the psychedelic voodoo music and theatrics which had driven his career since he took on the Dr. John persona, although it always remained an integral part of his music and identity. It was not until 1998's Anutha Zone that he again concentrated on this aspect of his music wholly for a full album. "After we cut the new record", he wrote, "I decided I'd had enough of the mighty-coo-de-fiyo hoodoo show, so I dumped the Gris-Gris routine we had been touring with since 1967 and worked up a new act—a Mardi Gras revue featuring the New Orleans standards we had covered in Gumbo."

In early 1973 Thomas Jefferson Kaye produced an album featuring a collaboration with Dr. John, Mike Bloomfield and John Paul Hammond. This album, Triumvirate, was recorded in Columbia Studios, San Francisco, and Village Recorders, Los Angeles.

In 1973, with Allen Toussaint producing and The Meters backing, Dr. John released the seminal New Orleans funk album In the Right Place. In the same way that Gris-Gris introduced the world to the voodoo-influenced side of his music, and in the manner that Dr. John's Gumbo began his career-long reputation as an esteemed interpreter of New Orleans standards, In the Right Place established Dr. John as one of the main ambassadors of New Orleans funk. In describing the album, Dr. John stated, "The album had more of a straight-ahead dance feel than ones I had done in the past, although it was still anchored solid in R&B." It rose to No. 24 on the Billboard album chart. In July 1973, the single "Right Place, Wrong Time" peaked at No. 9 on the Billboard Hot 100 singles chart, as well as peaking at No. 19 on the Hot Soul Singles chart. A second single, "Such a Night", peaked at No. 42. Still in heavy rotation on most classic rock stations, "Right Place Wrong Time" remains his most recognized song. Artists such as Bob Dylan, Bette Midler, and Doug Sahm contributed single lines to the lyrics, which lists several instances of ironic bad luck and failure.

Dr. John attempted to capitalize on In the Right Place's successful formula, again collaborating with Allen Toussaint and The Meters, for his next album, Desitively Bonnaroo – from part of which a Tennessee festival took as its name – released in 1974. Although similar in feel to In the Right Place, it failed to catch hold in the mainstream as its predecessor had done. It did produce the single "(Everybody Wanna Get Rich) Rite Away", which peaked at No. 92 on the Billboard Hot 100 chart, and to date is the last time he hit the Hot 100. It was his last pure funk album until 1994's Television, although like his voodoo and traditional New Orleans R&B influences, funk continued to heavily influence most of his work to the end, especially his live concerts.

In the mid-1970s Dr. John began an almost 20-year collaboration with the R&R Hall of Fame/Songwriters Hall of Fame writer Doc Pomus, to create songs for Dr. John's releases City Lights and Tango Palace, and for B.B. King's Stuart Levine-produced There Must Be a Better World Somewhere, which won a Grammy for Best Ethnic or Traditional Recording in 1982. Dr. John also recorded "I'm On a Roll" – the last song written with Pomus prior to his death in 1991 – for the now out-of-print Rhino/Forward Records 1995 tribute to Pomus titled Til the Night Is Gone: A Tribute to Doc Pomus. The tribute included covers of Pomus-penned songs by Bob Dylan, John Hiatt, Shawn Colvin, Brian Wilson, The Band, Los Lobos, Dion, Rosanne Cash, Solomon Burke, and Lou Reed. According to Pomus' daughter, Dr. John and her father were very close friends as well as writing partners. Dr. John delivered one of a number of eulogies and performed with singer Jimmy Scott at Pomus' funeral on March 17, 1991, in New York City.

On Thanksgiving Day 1976 he performed "Such a Night" at the farewell concert for The Band, which was filmed by Martin Scorsese and released as The Last Waltz. In 1979, he collaborated with the legendary Professor Longhair on Fess' (another nickname for Henry Byrd) last recording, Crawfish Fiesta, as a guitarist and co-producer. The album received the first W.C. Handy Blues Album of the Year award in 1980, and was released shortly after Longhair's death in January 1980.

== Later work ==
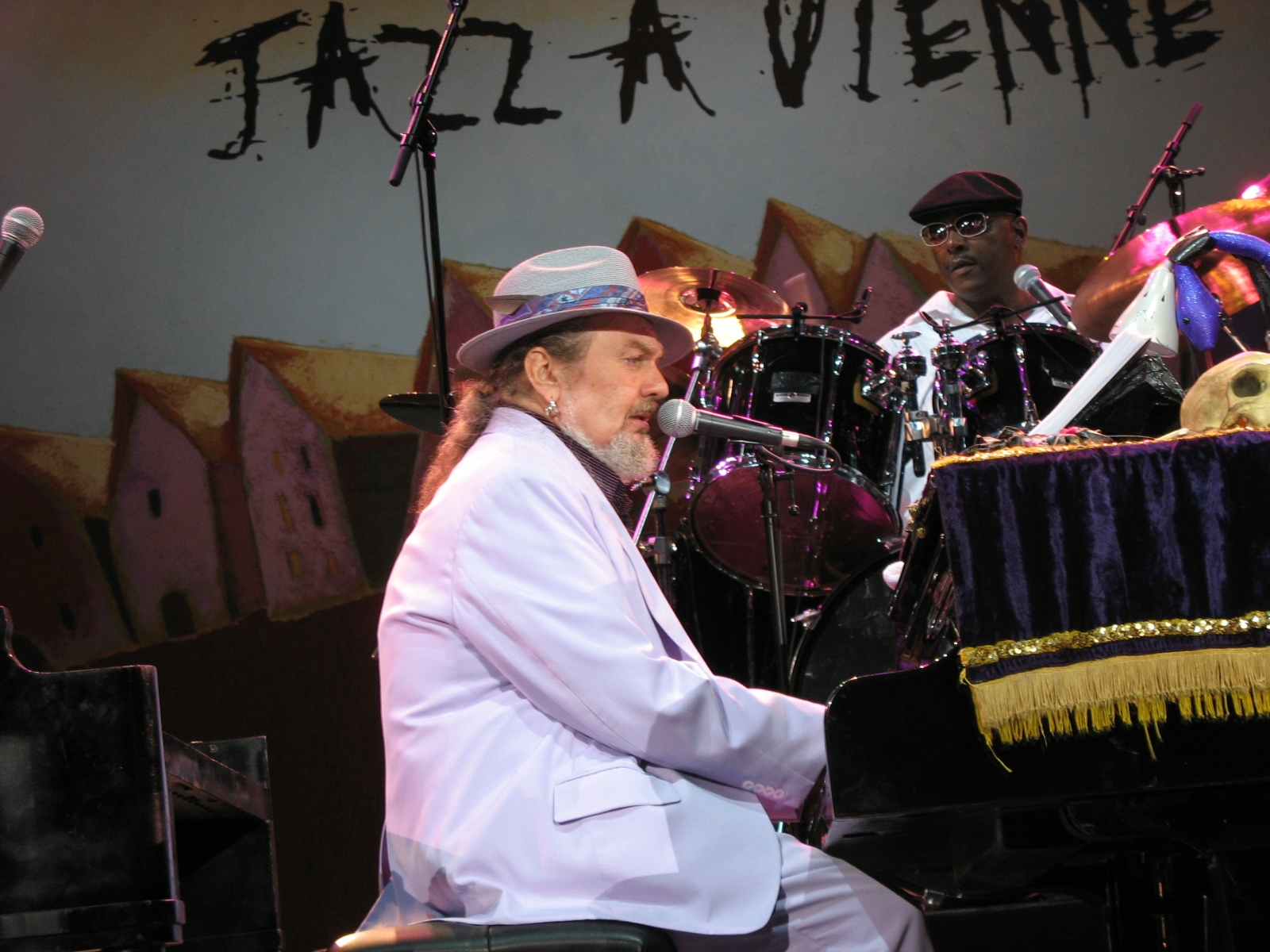
Dr. John at the 2006 Jazz à Vienne festival, in Vienne, France

By the mid-1970s, Rebennack was focusing on a blend of music that touched on blues, New Orleans R&B, Tin Pan Alley standards, and more. In 1975, his manager, Richard Flanzer, hired producer Bob Ezrin, and Hollywood Be Thy Name was recorded live at Cherokee Studios in Los Angeles, California. The studio was transformed into a New Orleans nightclub for the sessions. In 1981 and 1983, Dr. John recorded two solo piano albums, Dr. John Plays Mac Rebennack and The Brightest Smile in Town, for the Baltimore-based Clean Cuts label. In these two recordings he played many of his own boogie-woogie compositions.

Dr. John was also a prominent session musician throughout his career. He provided back-up vocals on the Rolling Stones' 1972 song "Let It Loose", and backed Carly Simon and James Taylor in their duet of "Mockingbird" (from Hotcakes) in 1974, and Neil Diamond on Beautiful Noise in 1976. He also contributed the song "More and More" to Simon's Playing Possum album. He played on 3 songs on the 1973 debut solo album by Maria Muldaur, including his composition "Three Dollar Bill". He sang on four songs and played piano on two songs on Muldaur's 1992 Louisiana Love Call. He was co-producer on Van Morrison's 1977 album A Period of Transition and also played keyboards and guitar. He contributed three songs as writer or co-writer ("Washer Woman", "The Ties That Bind", and "That's My Home") and also played guitar and keyboards on Levon Helm's 1977 release, Levon Helm & the RCO All-Stars. He performed on the March 19, 1977, episode of NBC's Saturday Night Live.

He played keyboards on the highly successful 1979 solo debut album by Rickie Lee Jones. He toured with Willy DeVille and contributed to his albums Return to Magenta (1978), Victory Mixture (1990), Backstreets of Desire (1992), and Big Easy Fantasy (1995). In 1997 he contributed piano and vocals to the Spiritualized song "Cop Shoot Cop" which appears on their album, Ladies and Gentlemen We Are Floating in Space. His music was featured in many films, including "New Looks" in National Lampoon's European Vacation in 1985 and "Such a Night" in Colors in 1988. In 1992, Dr. John released the album Goin' Back to New Orleans, which included many classic songs from New Orleans. Many great New Orleans–based musicians, such as Aaron Neville, the Neville Brothers, Al Hirt and Pete Fountain, backed up Dr. John on this album. He also performed as the first American artist at the Franco Follies festival in 1992.

Dr. John's longtime confidant and former personal manager, Paul Howrilla, was responsible for moving Dr. John from Los Angeles to New York and securing "crossover" work, as well as modifying Dr. John's image from the 1970s to the 1990s. Paul Howrilla was the brains behind the scenes, as Dr. John would attest. They remained close friends. Dr. John also provided vocals for Popeyes Chicken & Biscuits' "Luv dat chicken ..." jingle, as well as the theme song ("My Opinionation") for the early-1990s television sitcom Blossom. A version of "Do You Know What It Means to Miss New Orleans?" with Harry Connick Jr. was released on Connick's album 20 and VHS Singin' & Swingin' in 1990. Dr. John moved back to Louisiana in 2009.

From the late 1970s to 1991, Dr. John co-wrote over 115 songs with legendary Brill Building songwriter Doc Pomus. Some of the songs created with Pomus were recorded by Marianne Faithfull, B.B. King, Irma Thomas, Johnny Adams, and others. On March 17, 1991, Dr. John performed "My Buddy" at the funeral for Pomus.

His movie credits included Martin Scorsese's documentary The Last Waltz, in which he joined the Band for a performance of his song "Such a Night", the 1978 Beatles-inspired musical Sgt. Pepper's Lonely Hearts Club Band, and Blues Brothers 2000, in which he joined the fictional band the Louisiana Gator Boys to perform the songs "How Blue Can You Get" and "New Orleans". His version of the Donovan song "Season of the Witch" was also featured in this movie and on the soundtrack. In 1996, he performed the song "Cruella de Ville" during the end credits of the film 101 Dalmatians.

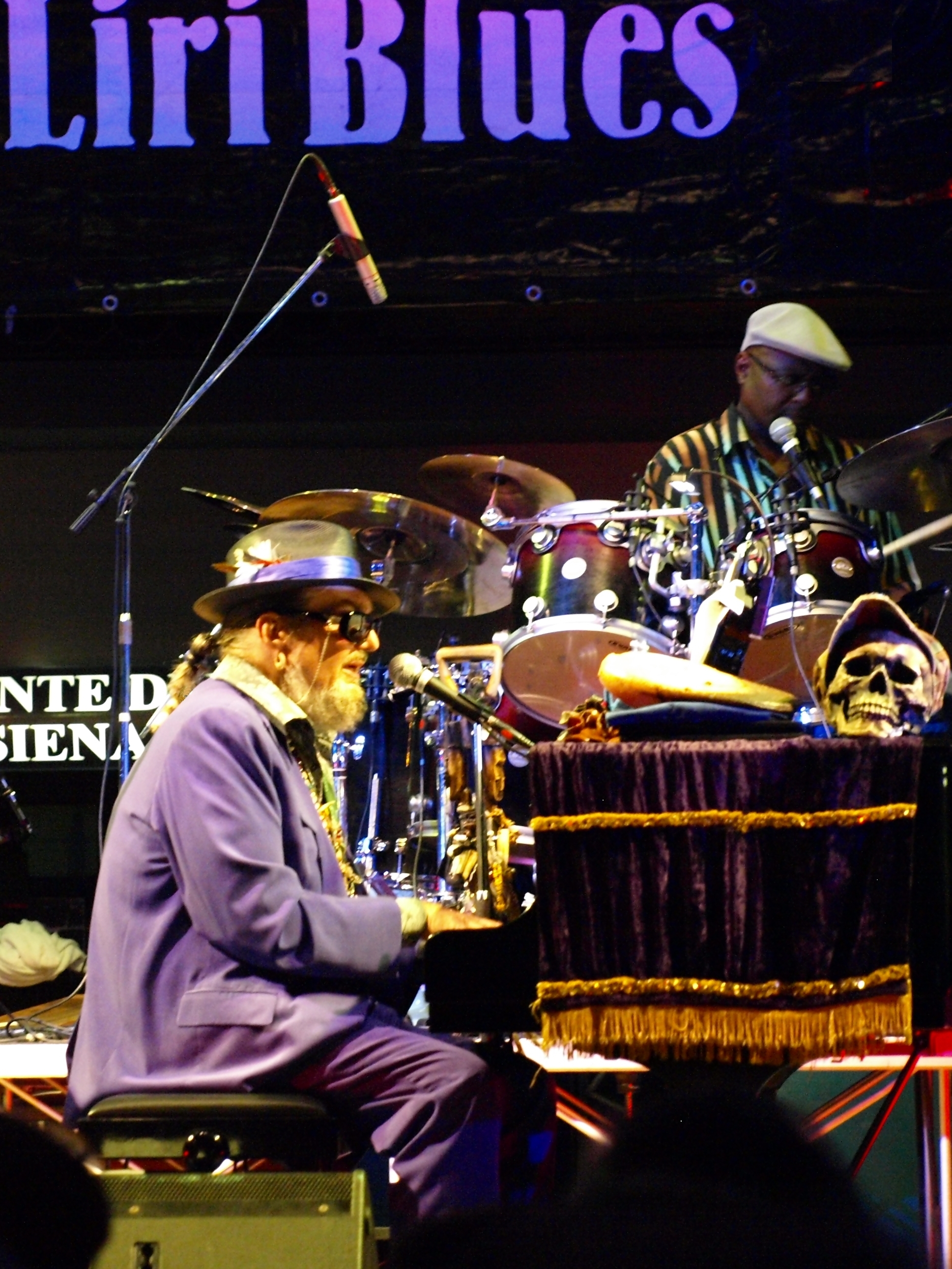
Dr. John at the Liri Blues Festival, Italy, July 2010

He wrote and performed the score for the film version of John Steinbeck's Cannery Row released in 1982. His hit song "Right Place Wrong Time" was used extensively in the movies Dazed and Confused and Sahara and the series American Horror Story: Coven. Dr. John was also featured in several video and audio blues and New Orleans piano lessons published by Homespun Tapes. Other documentary film scores include the New Orleans dialect film Yeah You Rite! (1985) and American Tongues in 1987.

Between July and September 1989, Dr. John toured in the first Ringo Starr & His All-Starr Band, alongside Levon Helm, Rick Danko, Nils Lofgren, Jim Keltner, Joe Walsh, Billy Preston, Clarence Clemons and himself of piano, bass and vocals. The tour produced the 1990 live album Ringo Starr and His All-Starr Band.

In 1997, he appeared on the charity single version of Lou Reed's "Perfect Day". In the same year, he played piano on the Spiritualized song "Cop Shoot Cop ...", from their critically acclaimed album Ladies and Gentlemen We Are Floating in Space. Frontman Jason Pierce, a fan of Dr. John's music, reciprocated by guesting on Dr. John's 1998 album Anutha Zone along with drummer Damon Reece and guitarist Thighpaulsandra. He recorded the live album Trippin' Live with drummer Herman V. Ernest III, David Barard, bass, Tommy Moran, guitar, trumpeter Charlie Miller, tenor Red Tyler, and baritone sax Ronnie Cuber.

In September 2005, he performed Bobby Charles' "Walkin' to New Orleans", to close the Shelter from the Storm: A Concert for the Gulf Coast telethon. This was for the relief of Hurricane Katrina victims, following the devastation of his hometown of New Orleans. In November 2005, he released a four-song EP, Sippiana Hericane, to benefit New Orleans Musicians Clinic, Salvation Army, and the Jazz Foundation of America. On February 5, 2006, he joined fellow New Orleans native Aaron Neville, Detroit resident Aretha Franklin and a 150-member choir for the national anthem at Super Bowl XL as part of a pre-game tribute to New Orleans. On February 8, 2006, he joined Allen Toussaint, Bonnie Raitt, The Edge, and Irma Thomas to perform "We Can Can" as the closing performance at the Grammy Awards of 2006. In 2014 he performed at the NBA All Star Game as did Pharrell Williams and Janelle Monáe.

On May 12, 2006, Dr. John recorded a live session at Abbey Road Studios for Live from Abbey Road. His performance was aired alongside those of LeAnn Rimes and Massive Attack on the Sundance Channel in the US and Channel 4 in the UK. He performed the opening theme music to the PBS children's program Curious George, broadcast since 2006.

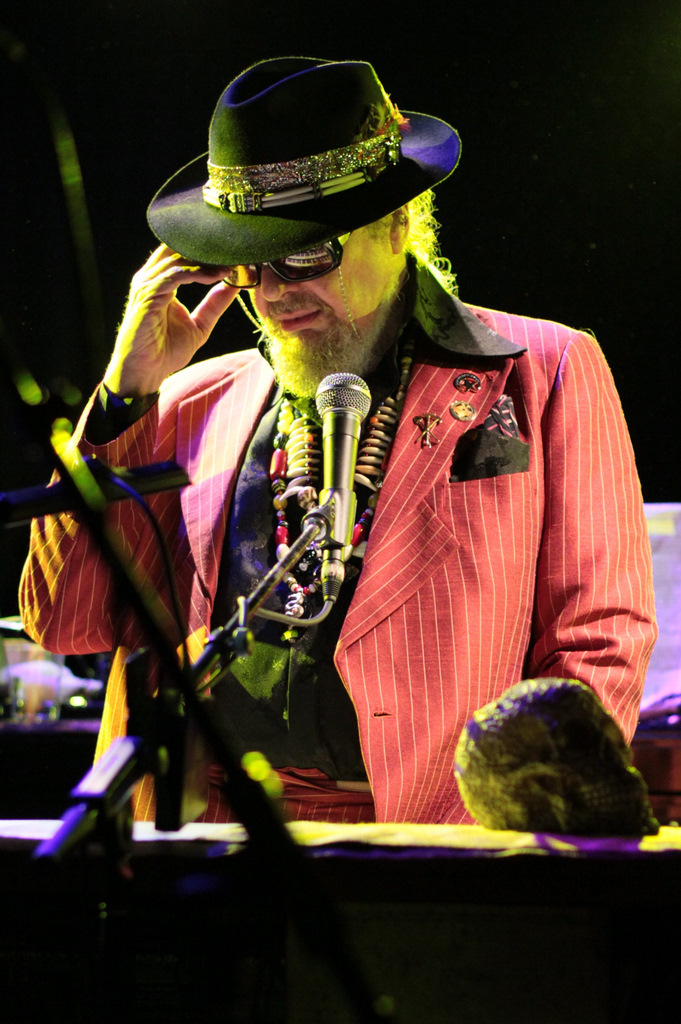
Dr. John performing at Le Poisson Rouge, New York City, 2011

On July 30, 2006, Dr. John performed a solo piano benefit for New Orleans composer and arranger Wardell Quezergue (King Floyd's "Groove Me") at a New Orleans Musicians Relief Fund benefit at the Black Orchid Theatre in Chicago. Special guest Mike Mills of R.E.M. was in attendance, along with an all-star funk band.

Dr. John performed the theme music to the Fox drama K-Ville. In 2007, he contributed to Goin' Home: A Tribute to Fats Domino, performing "Don't Leave Me This Way". In January 2008, Dr. John was inducted into The Louisiana Music Hall of Fame. Later, in February, he performed at All-Star Saturday Night, part of the NBA All-Star Weekend hosted by New Orleans. The same year, Dr. John released his Grammy Award-winning City that Care Forgot, about Hurricane Katrina's devastation in New Orleans.

In the 2009 Disney film The Princess and the Frog, Dr. John sang the opening tune, "Down in New Orleans". He reigned as King of the Krewe du Vieux for the 2010 New Orleans Mardi Gras season. On May 13, 2010, Dr. John played alongside The Roots on Late Night with Jimmy Fallon (episode 246) and was warmly greeted by Jimmy's first guest, Keith Richards. In June 2010, Dr John played at the Glastonbury festival, Shepton Mallet, UK.

Dr. John played keyboards and had a major role in shaping Gregg Allman's 2011 album Low Country Blues, which was produced by T-Bone Burnett. In 2011, he collaborated with Hugh Laurie on the song "After You've Gone" on Laurie's album Let Them Talk. The same year, Dr. John, Allen Toussaint and The Meters performed Desitively Bonnaroo at the Bonnaroo Music and Arts Festival in Manchester, Tennessee, as part of the festival's tenth year celebration. The name of the festival was taken from the 1974 Dr. John album, Desitively Bonnaroo. The same year he was inducted into the Rock & Roll Hall of Fame along with Neil Diamond, Alice Cooper, Darlene Love and Tom Waits.

In 2012, Dr. John released Locked Down, a collaboration with Dan Auerbach of The Black Keys, who produced the record and played guitar on it. The album received very positive reviews for its raw, Afrobeat-influenced sound. The Los Angeles Times said that it showed Dr. John "exiting a period of relative creative stagnation by creating something magical, the embodiment of everything he's done but pushed in a clear new direction". It won a Grammy Award, as did Auerbach for producing it.

In 2014, Dr. John released a Louis Armstrong tribute album, Ske-Dat-De-Dat: The Spirit of Satch, on Concord Records USA and Proper Records in Europe. Dr. John described the inspiration of the album as Louis Armstrong coming to him in a dream and telling him "do my music your way". The Los Angeles Times said, "Tribute albums come and go, but it's a real rarity that can snap a listener to attention like Dr. John's new salute to jazz founding father Louis Armstrong." That spring, "The Musical Mojo of Mac", a New Orleans concert to honor Dr. John, was introduced by Brian Williams and kicked off by Bruce Springsteen singing "Right Place, Wrong Time", with Dr. John and an all-star band which included event producer Don Was on bass.

Dr. John recorded "Let 'Em In" in the Paul McCartney tribute album The Art of McCartney. "It's a wonder to behold, as the ageless Dr. John re-envisions "Let 'Em In" as a laconic come on, an invitation to party or maybe something more, once a few more glasses have been raised", wrote Something Else. "At the same time, he ends up lacing the song with darker feelings, as well."

Foo Fighters' Dave Grohl interviewed Dr. John about music in the New Orleans-themed episode of their HBO series Sonic Highways "(including the hypnotic reveal of Dr. John's given name)", wrote a Decider reviewer.

From 2014 to 2016, Dr. John performed with an alternate band, including at a Hollywood Bowl tribute "Yes We Can Can" for his late friend Allen Toussaint on July 20, 2016. Also performing Allen Toussaint compositions were New Orleans artists Irma Thomas, Cyril Neville, the band Galactic, and the Allen Toussaint Band. In 2016, a double album and DVD of the concert, The Musical Mojo of Dr. John: Celebrating Mac and his Music, was released.

In 2017, Members of Dr. John's band The Gris Gris Krewe with music director Roland Guerin performed "Right Place Wrong Time" in the video kicking off the 2017 NBA All-Star Game. The same year, Dr. John was a headliner on The Last Waltz 40th Anniversary Tour with Music Directors Warren Haynes and Don Was, reprising his "Such a Night" performance from the original concert and film with The Band.

The year 2017 also saw his first single "Storm Warning", recorded as a tribute to Bo Diddley, featured on the Logan Lucky soundtrack. In April, he joined John Legend (who inducted him into the Rock Hall) and Jon Batiste on The Late Show with Stephen Colbert, and he appeared in Tig Notaro's critically acclaimed Amazon TV series One Mississippi.

On November 1, 2017, Dr. John celebrated Mac Month as proclaimed by the New Orleans City Council in a reception at Napoleon House, and his birthday was proclaimed Dr. John Day in the City of New Orleans for the fact that he "rose to international recognition for his musical funkitude in performing, writing and producing." Louisiana Governor John Bel Edwards also issued a Statement of Recognition to Dr. John for "embodying the culture of the state from New Orleans to the Bayou."

Dr. John's birth date was corrected in 2018 when his hometown newspaper, The Times-Picayune, discovered in their records that he was actually born on November 20, 1941, as opposed to the commonly listed November 21, 1940. He added a year to his age as an underage prodigy with a local hit, so he could get into gigs.

On September 23, 2022, Rounder Records and the Dr. John estate released Dr. John's posthumous country & western album Things Happen That Way with guests Aaron Neville, Willie Nelson, and Lukas Nelson & Promise of the Real. "The New Orleans piano man who embodied the musical mélange of his hometown had the kind of drawly, lived-in voice that only improved with age," The New York Times wrote. "So Things Happen That Way, Dr. John's final album, recorded the year he died, 2019 - captures him in peak form." The album was nominated for a Grammy for Best Americana Album in November 2022.

On June 2, 2023, Montreux Jazz Fest and the Dr. John estate released Dr. John: The Montreux Years, with live performances from 1986 to 2012. "It's a great way to say adieu", stated Offbeat Magazine.

In November 2023, Dr. John: Solo Piano Live in New Orleans 1984 was released by the Dr. John estate and 501 Record Club.

On April 20, 2024, Dr. John: Gris-Gris Gumbo Ya Ya: Singles 1968-1974 was released by Omnivore and the Dr. John estate, on double purple vinyl as a special Record Store Day release, and as a CD on April 26, 2024.

In November, 2024, "When The Saints Go Marching In Medley" was released by Montreux Jazz Festival and the Dr. John estate, as a preview to the digital album Dr. John: Live in Montreux 1986, released to commemorate Dr. John's birthday on November 20.

In October, 2025, the single "Mama Roux (Live at The Village Gate)" was released by Omnivore and the Dr. John Estate. In November, 2025, The Estate and Omnivore released the full live album from a 1988 show both on a double CD set and digitally.

On March 27, 2026, The Dr. John Estate and MIG Music (Made in Germany) released Dr. John - Live at Rockpalast 1999 on DVD, a CD box set and on streaming platforms.

On September 25, 2026, the single "One Room Country Shack" (Live at The Turning Point, May 7, 1987)" was released by Omnivore and the Dr. John Estate. The full album was released November 20, 2026.

== Musical style ==
Dr. John's style pans from blues and pop to jazz, boogie woogie, rock-and-roll, R&B & psychedelic rock.

According to AllMusic, Dr. John "first became a star by taking the sounds and traditions of New Orleans blues, jazz, and R&B and twisting them into new forms". Billboard described him as a soul, funk and boogie-woogie musician who "became a New Orleans musical icon not as a pop star of the present, but as a channeler of those who came before." NPR placed his style within New Orleans rhythm and blues. Ultimate Classic Rock said that he was known "for his influential brand of blues rock". He was also a "major swamp rock artist", according to Americana UK. Dr. John had a strong relationship with Gospel music, and often integrated/based his own music with Gospel music.

== Personal life and death ==
Dr. John was married three times and told The New York Times that he had "a lot" of children.

His first wife was Lydia Crow, with whom he had two children, Craig and Karla. His second wife was Lorraine Sherman, with whom he had three children: Tara, Jessica, and Jennifer. His third wife was Cat Yellen. His children Craig and Jessica predeceased him. He also had a granddaughter, Stephanie, and a grandson named Allen O'Quin who predeceased him.

He had a heroin addiction; however, in December 1989, he completed his final rehabilitation stint with the help of Narcotics Anonymous, and remained clean for the rest of his life.

On June 6, 2019, Dr. John died of a heart attack. His family announced through his longtime publicist Karen Dalton Beninato that he died at the break of day, and "he created a unique blend of music which carried his hometown, New Orleans, at its heart, as it was always in his heart."

== Awards and honors ==
The winner of six Grammy Awards, Rebennack was inducted into the Rock and Roll Hall of Fame by singer John Legend in March 2011.

In May 2013, Rebennack received an honorary doctorate of fine arts from Tulane University. His posthumous album Things Happen That Way was nominated for a Grammy for Best Americana Album in November 2022.

== Filmography ==
- Soundstage - New Orleans Swamp (1974), as himself (TV Special featuring Professor Longhair, Earl King, The Meters & Dr. John)
- The Last Waltz (1978), as himself (performs "Such A Night")
- SCTV, episode 80, (1981), as himself (appears in sketch "Polynesian Town"; performs "Iko Iko" and "Such a Night")
- Late Night with David Letterman (April 27, 1982), as himself (accompanying Sippie Wallace and Bonnie Raitt on "Women Be Wise")
- Late Night with David Letterman (March 17, 1983), as himself (performs "Such A Night")
- Late Night with David Letterman (September 7, 1987), as himself (performs "Accentuate The Positive")
- Late Night with David Letterman (December 15, 1989), as himself (performs "Silent Night")
- Late Night with David Letterman (December 28, 1990), as himself (performs duet of "Merry Christmas, Baby" with Charles Brown)
- Yakety Yak, Take it Back (1991), as himself and 'Yakety Yak' (voice) (live action/animated music video)
- Late Night with David Letterman (September 19, 1992), as himself (performs "Goodnight, Irene")
- Touched by an Angel (1996), as himself (2 episodes)
- VH1 Duets - Eric Clapton and Dr. John (1996), as himself (performance recorded at Roseland Ballroom, New York City; "Right Place, Wrong Time"; "St. James Infirmary"; "How Long Blues"; "Roberta"; and "Layla")
- Late Show with David Letterman (December 22, 1997), as himself (performs "Stepping Stone" with G. Love & Special Sauce)
- Blues Brothers 2000 (1998), as himself
- Late Show with David Letterman (December 1, 1999), as himself (performs "Is You Is or Is You Ain't My Baby" with B. B. King)
- Late Show with David Letterman (November 28, 2000), as himself (performs duet of "Merry Christmas, Baby" with Christina Aguilera)
- Late Show with David Letterman (June 17, 2008), as himself (performs "Time for Change" with The Lower 911)
- Treme (HBO Series - 2010–2013), as himself
- Top Chef (2013), as himself (guest judge)
- NCIS: New Orleans (2015), as himself (1 episode)
- One Note at a Time (2018), as himself

== Discography ==
=== As leader ===
Sources:

- Gris-Gris (1968) (Atco 33-234 [monaural]; SD 33-234 [stereo])
- Babylon (1969) (Atco, SD 33-270)
- Remedies (1970) (Atco, SD 33-316)
- The Sun, Moon & Herbs (1971) (Atco, SD 33-362)
- Dr. John's Gumbo (1972) (Atco, SD 7006)
- In the Right Place (1973) (Atco, SD 7018)
- Zu Zu Man (1973) (Trip Records, TLP 9518)
- Desitively Bonnaroo (1974) (Atco, SD 7043)
- Anytime, Anyplace (1974) (Barometer, BRM 67001) aka 'Next Hex (The Nashville Sessions '74)'
- Cut Me While I'm Hot (The Sixties Sessions) (1975) (DJM, 2019)
- The Night Tripper (1977) (Crazy Cajun, CCLP-1037)
- MalcolM RebennacK (1977) (Crazy Cajun, CCLP-1040)
- One Night Late (1977) (Karate, KSD-5404) same tracks as Anytime, Anyplace
- City Lights (1978) (Horizon/A&M, SP-732)
- Tango Palace (1979) (Horizon/A&M, SP-740)
- Take Me back to New Orleans (1981) (Black Lion, BLM 61001) with Chris Barber)
- Dr. John Plays Mac Rebennack (The Legendary Sessions Volume One) (1982) (Clean Cuts, CC 705; later expanded)
- The Brightest Smile in Town (The Legendary Sessions Volume Two) (1983) (Clean Cuts, CC 707; later expanded)
- In a Sentimental Mood (1989) (Warner Bros., 25889)
- Goin' Back to New Orleans (1992) (Warner Bros., 26940)
- Brer Rabbit and Boss Lion (1992) (Kid Rhino, 70496) children's album told by Danny Glover, music by Dr. John
- Television (1994) (GRP/MCA, 4024)
- Afterglow (1995) (Blue Thumb/GRP/MCA, 7000)
- Anutha Zone (1998) (Pointblank/Virgin/EMI, 46218)
- Duke Elegant (2000) (Blue Note/Parlophone/EMI, 23220) (a tribute to Duke Ellington)
- Creole Moon (2001) (Blue Note/Parlophone/EMI, 34591)
- N'Awlinz: Dis Dat or d'Udda (2004) (Blue Note/Parlophone/EMI, 78602)
- Sippiana Hericane (2005) (Blue Note/Parlophone/EMI, 45687)
- Mercernary (2006) (Blue Note/Parlophone/EMI, 54541) (a tribute to Johnny Mercer)
- City That Care Forgot (2008) (429/Savoy, 17703) (with The Lower 911)
- Tribal (2010) (429/Savoy, 17803) (with The Lower 911)
- Locked Down (2012) (Nonesuch/WEA, 530395)
- Ske-Dat-De-Dat: The Spirit of Satch (2014) (Concord/UMe, 35187) (a tribute to Louis Armstrong)
- Things Happen That Way (2022) (Rounder, 1166101698)
- Big Band Voodoo (2019) (Orange Music, [UPC: 762183509823]) (with WDR Big Band Köln) - recorded in 1995
- Gumbo Blues (2020) (Purple Pyramid, 2023) - more 1974 Nashville sessions material
- Frankie & Johnny (2024) (Sundazed, 5660) - recorded August 1981 & November 1982 for the Clean Cuts label but unreleased at the time

=== Live albums ===
Sources:

- Hollywood Be Thy Name (1975) (United Artists, UA-LA552G)
- Such a Night! Live in London (1984) (Spindrift, SPIN 107)
- On a Mardi Gras Day (1983 [1990]) (Great Southern, GS-11024) (with Chris Barber)
- Trippin' Live (1997) (Wind-Up/Surefire, 13047)
- Live at Wrightegaarden 2000-07-18 (2001) (Wrightegaarden Concerts/Langesund Muse, Wr/LMPCD-2)
- All By Hisself - Live at The Lonestar (2003) (Skinji Brim/Hyena, 9317) - recorded December 22–23, 1986
- Live at Montreux 1995 (2005) (Eagle, 20078)
- Right Place, Right Time (Live at Tipitina's – Mardi Gras '89) (2006) (Hyena, 9344)
- Live in Sweden 1987 (2016) (MVD, 8128) (with Johnny Winter)
- The Musical Mojo of Dr. John: Celebrating Mac and His Music (2016) (Concord/UMe, 00216 [UPC: 888072009820]) - recorded May 3, 2014 [2-CD set]
- Recorded Live In Tokyo, Japan (2019) (Cargo, 5001) - recorded 1992
- Dr. John: Solo Piano Live in New Orleans 1984 (2023) (501/Tipitina's Record Club, TRC-0302)
- Dr. John: The Montreux Years 1986–2012 (2023) (BMG, [UPC: 4050538799712])
- Dr. John: Live at Montreux 1986 (2024) (Montreux Sounds, under exclusive license to Montreux Media Ventures and BMG Rights Management)
- Live at the Village Gate (2025) (Omnivore Recordings, OVCD-612, UPC: 810075115208) [2-CD set] - recorded 1988-03-05 in New York City
- Dr. John Live at Rockpalast 1999 (2026) (MIG Music) (DVD, CD set] recorded 1999 in Germany
- Live at the Turning Point (2026) (Omnivore Recordings, OVCD-647, UPC: 810075116793) [2-CD set] - recorded 1987-05-07 in New York City

=== With Mike Bloomfield and John Hammond Jr. ===
- Triumvirate (Columbia, 1973)

=== With Bluesiana Triangle ===
Sources:

- Bluesiana Triangle (1990) (Windham Hill Jazz, 10125) (with Art Blakey and David Newman)
- Bluesiana II (1991) (Windham Hill Jazz, 10133) (with David Newman and Ray Anderson)

=== With Crescent City Gold ===
- The Ultimate Session (1994) (High Street/Windham Hill, 10324) (with Allen Toussaint, Red Tyler, Lee Allen and Earl Palmer)

=== Compilations ===
- Love Potion [AKA Loser for You Baby] (1981) (Accord, 7118)
- The Ultimate Dr. John (1987) (Warner Special Products, 27612)
- Mos' Scocious: The Dr. John Anthology (1993) (Rhino, 71450) 2-CD set
- The Very Best of Dr. John (1995) (Rhino, 71924)
- 'Right Place Wrong Time' and Other Hits (1997) (Flashback/Rhino, 72885)
- The Essentials (2002) (Elektra/Rhino, 76068)
- Storm Warning (The Early Sessions of Mac 'Dr. John' Rebennack) (2004) (Westside, WESM-641)
- The Best of the Parlophone Years (2005) (Blue Note/Parlophone/EMI, 60920)
- The Definitive Pop Collection (2006) (Atlantic/Rhino, 70814) 2-CD set
- Dr. John: Original Album Series (2009) (Atco/Rhino, UPC: 081227983673) 5-CD set (reissues Gris-Gris; Babylon; The Sun, Moon & Herbs; Dr. John's Gumbo; In The Right Place in a slipcase box set)
- The Atco/Atlantic Singles 1968–1974 (2015) (Omnivore Recordings, OVCD-149)
- The Atco Albums Collection (2017) (Atco/Rhino, UPC: 081227933876) 7-CD set (reissues all 7 original Atco albums in a clamshell box set; all recordings remastered)
- An Introduction to Dr. John (2019) (Flashback/Atlantic, UPC: 603497852642)
- Gris-Gris Gumbo Ya Ya: Singles 1968–1974 (2024) (Omnivore Recordings, UPC: 810075113853) (Double purple vinyl album-set for Record Store Day; the CD release followed).

=== Other contributions ===
Source: from the 2,012 credits listed by AllMusic

- Freak Out!, The Mothers of Invention (Verve, 1966)
- Living the Blues, Canned Heat (Liberty, 1968)
- Future Blues, Canned Heat (Liberty, 1970)
- Play the Blues, Buddy Guy & Junior Wells (Atlantic, 1972) – piano on "A Man of Many Words", "T-Bone Shuffle" and "Messin' With the Kid".
- Young, Gifted and Black, Aretha Franklin (Atlantic, 1972) – percussion on "Rock Steady".
- Exile on Main St., The Rolling Stones (Rolling Stones Records, 1972) – piano, backing vocals on "Let It Loose"; backing vocals on "All Down the Line".
- The Weapon, David Newman (Atlantic, 1973)
- Hotcakes, Carly Simon (Elektra, 1974) – piano and organ on "Mockingbird".
- King Biscuit Boy, King Biscuit Boy [Richard Newell] (Epic, 1974)
- Beautiful Noise, Neil Diamond (Columbia, 1976) – organ
- Levon Helm & the RCO All-Stars, Levon Helm (ABC, 1977)
- Playin' Up a Storm, Gregg Allman Band (Capricorn, 1977) – piano and clavinet, songwriting credits on "Let This Be a Lesson to Ya'".
- A Period of Transition, Van Morrison (Warner Bros., 1977)
- Inphasion, Papa John Creach (DJM, 1978) – piano and organ on "All the World Loves a Winner" and "Southern Strut".
- Casey's Shadow - Original Motion Picture Soundtrack (Columbia, 1978) – performing "Jolie Blonde" and "Coon-Ass Song".
- Return to Magenta, Mink DeVille (Capitol, 1978) – piano
- Rickie Lee Jones, Rickie Lee Jones (Warner Bros., 1979) – keyboards
- In Harmony: A Sesame Street Record (various artists) (Warner Bros., 1980) – duet with Libby Titus on "The Sailor and the Mermaid".
- Against the Wind, Bob Seger (Capitol, 1980) – keyboards on "The Horizontal Bop".
- In Harmony 2 (various artists) (Columbia, 1981) – performing "Splish Splash".
- Twilight Time, Bennie Wallace (Blue Note, 1985) – piano and organ; also features Stevie Ray Vaughan as a guest on guitar.
- Midnight Lady Called the Blues, Jimmy Witherspoon (Muse, 1986) – piano
- Christmas Island, Leon Redbone (Rounder, 1987) – duet with Redbone on "Frosty the Snowman".
- Accidentally on Purpose, Gillan & Glover (Virgin, 1988) – piano on "Can't Believe You Wanna Leave".
- 20, Harry Connick Jr. (Columbia, 1988) – organ and duet with Connick on "Do You Know What It Means to Miss New Orleans".
- Big Fun, Elvin Bishop (Alligator, 1988)
- Voodoo, Dirty Dozen Brass Band (Columbia, 1989) – piano and vocal on "It's All Over Now".
- Night Beat, Hank Crawford (Milestone, 1989)
- Groove Master, Hank Crawford (Milestone, 1990)
- Ringo Starr and His All-Starr Band, Ringo Starr (EMI, 1990; CD: Rykodisc RCD-10190)
- Indian Blues, Donald Harrison (Candid, 1991)
- New Orleans Gumbo, Donald Harrison (Candid, 1991 [rel. 2013])
- Let Me In, Johnny Winter (Pointblank/Virgin 1991)
- Who's Snakin' Who?, Syndicate of Soul (Shanachie, 1993) – vocal on "Ain't No Sunshine".
- Strange Pleasure, Jimmie Vaughan (Epic, 1994)
- Till the Night is Gone: A Tribute to Doc Pomus (various artists) (Forward/Rhino, 1995) – performing "I'm on a Roll".
- Boogie to Heaven, Gail Wynters (VWC Records, 1995) – featuring Dr. John and Roger Kellaway
- 101 Dalmatians - Original Soundtrack (Disney/Hollywood, 1996) – performing "Cruella De Vil".
- "Perfect Day" (BBC corporate film and charity release, 1997) – featuring amongst others, Dr. John (performing Lou Reed's "Perfect Day"). Reached number one on the UK singles chart.
- Ladies and Gentlemen We Are Floating in Space, Spiritualized (Dedicated Records, 1997) – piano and vocal on "Cop Shoot Cop".
- Blues Brothers 2000 - Original Motion Picture Soundtrack (Uptown/Universal, 1998) – performing "Season of the Witch" with the Blues Brothers Band.
- Let the Good Times Roll: The Music of Louis Jordan, B.B. King (MCA, 1999) – piano and duet with King on ""Is You Is, or Is You Ain't (My Baby)".
- The Skiffle Sessions – Live in Belfast 1998, Van Morrison/Lonnie Donegan/Chris Barber (Pointblank/Virgin/EMI, 2000). Dr. John was playing Belfast the same night, and after his own concert had finished, turned up to play on the last few tracks.
- The Max Weinberg 7 (Hip-O, 2000) – piano and vocal on "Catch 'Em in the Act".
- My Kind of Christmas, Christina Aguilera (RCA, 2000) – duet with Aguilera on "Merry Christmas, Baby".
- Dear Louis, Nicholas Payton (Verve, 2001) – vocal on "Blues in the Night" (a duet with Dianne Reeves) and "Mack the Knife".
- Dot Com Blues, Jimmy Smith (Blue Thumb/Verve, 2001) – piano and vocal on "Only in It for the Money", piano on "I Just Wanna Make Love to You".
- Jools Holland's Big Band Rhythm & Blues, Jools Holland (Rhino, 2002) – performing "The Hand That Changed Its Mind".
- Sousafunk Ave., Kirk Joseph's Backyard Groove (Audible Vision, 2005) – vocal on "I Can't Get Started".
- Our New Orleans 2005 (various artists) (Nonesuch/WEA, 2005) – performing "World I Never Made".
- The Disney Standards, Steve Tyrell (Disney/Hollywood, 2006) – duet with Tyrell on "You've Got a Friend in Me".
- The New Orleans Social Club: Sing Me Back Home (various artists) (Burgundy/Sony BMG/Honey Darling Records, 2006) – performing "Walking to New Orleans".
- Goin' Home: A Tribute to Fats Domino (various artists) (Vanguard, 2007) 2-CD set – performing "Don't Leave Me This Way".
- One Kind Favor, B. B. King (Geffen, 2008) – on piano.
- Curious George: A Very Monkey Christmas - Music from the Motion Picture (2009) (429/Savoy, 17748) - the theme song
- Let Them Talk, Hugh Laurie (Warner Bros., 2011) – duet with Laurie on "After You've Gone".
- Use Me, David Bromberg (Appleseed, 2011)
- Low Country Blues, Gregg Allman (Rounder, 2011)
- Renaissance, Marcus Miller (Concord/UMe, 2012) – vocal on "Tightrope".
- The Rough Guide to Voodoo (various artists) (World Music Network, 2013)
- Son of Rogues Gallery: Pirate Ballads, Sea Songs & Chanteys (Anti-/Epitaph, 2013) 2-CD set – performing "In Lure of the Tropics".
- Cracking the Code, Stephen Dale Petit (333 Records, 2013) – piano and organ on "Get You Off" and "Hubert's Blues".
- Decisions, Bobby Rush with Blinddog Smokin' (Silver Talon, 2014) – duet with Rush on "Another Murder in New Orleans".
- The Arcs vs. The Inventors, Vol. 1, The Arcs (feat. Dan Auerbach) (Nonesuch, 2015) Limited Edition 10" EP – with Dr. John, David Hidalgo
- One Note at a Time (original soundtrack) (Louisiana Red Hot Records, 2018) – performing "Roscoe's Song/Down the Road", and "This Little Light of Mine" (feat. Gaynelle Neville, Cyril Neville, Amasi Miller, Shannon Powell, Jesse Boyd, Detroit Brooks, Paul Pattan, Donald Harrison).

=== In popular culture ===
- Dr. John was the inspiration for Jim Henson's Muppet character Dr. Teeth.
- Dr. John's unexpected performance on June 20, 1986, in Blairgowrie, Scotland is the subject of Michael Marra's song "Mac Rebennack's Visit to Blairgowrie" on his 2007 EP, Quintet. Upon being told of the song, Dr. John wrote Marra a cheque for "love and life".

== Recognition ==
=== Grammy Awards ===
- 1989 Best Jazz Vocal Performance, Duo Or Group – "Makin' Whoopee" with Rickie Lee Jones
- 1992 Best Traditional Blues Album – Goin' Back To New Orleans
- 1997 Best Rock Instrumental Performance – "SRV Shuffle" with Jimmie Vaughan, Eric Clapton, Bonnie Raitt, Robert Cray, B.B. King, Buddy Guy, and Art Neville
- 2000 Best Pop Collaboration With Vocals – "Is You Is, Or Is You Ain't (My Baby)" with B.B. King
- 2008 Best Contemporary Blues Album – City That Care Forgot
- 2013 Best Blues Album – Locked Down

=== Rock and Roll Hall of Fame ===
- 2011 Rock and Roll Hall of Fame Inductee

== See also ==
- List of one-hit wonders in the United States § 1970s
