= Little Richard discography =

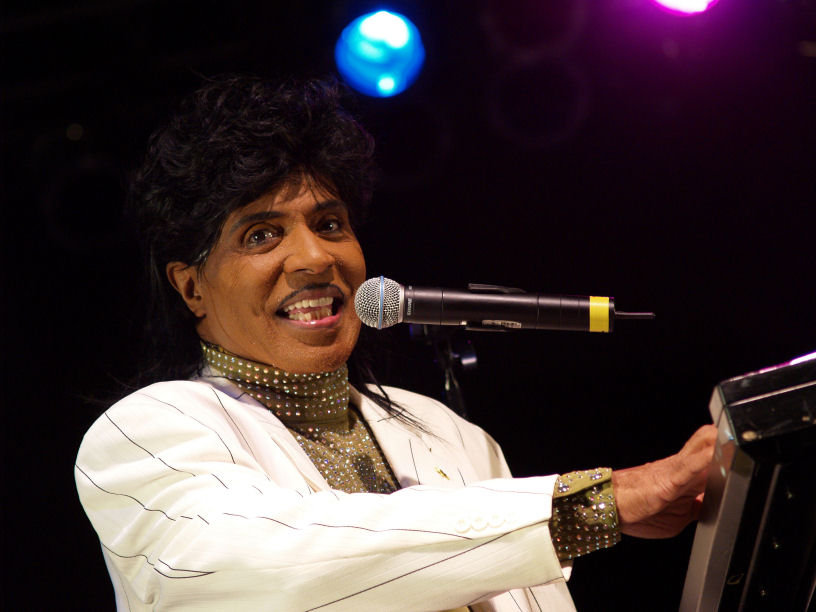
- Little Richard performing in Austin, Texas, in March 2007
- Studio albums: 19
- Live albums: 3
- Compilation albums: 36
- Singles: 77

This page is a discography for American musician Little Richard (1932–2020). Described as "the architect of rock and roll", Little Richard was a pioneering singer-songwriter whose career also encompassed rhythm and blues, soul, and gospel. He began his recording career with RCA Victor in 1951, releasing his first singles. He attained international success following his signing to Specialty Records in 1955 and the issue of his first LP album two years later. Although his last album was released in 1992, Little Richard continued to tour into the 21st century.

== Studio albums ==
Title	Album details	Peak chart positions
Title	Album details	US
Here's Little Richard	Released: March 1957; Label: Specialty; Format: mono LP	13
Little Richard	Released: 1958; Label: Specialty; Format: mono LP	76
The Fabulous Little Richard	Released: 1958 / March 1959; Label: Specialty; Format: mono LP	—
Pray Along with Little Richard, Volume 1	Released: 1960; Label: End; Format: mono LP	—
Pray Along with Little Richard (Vol 2)	Released: 1960; Label: End; Format: mono LP	—
The King of the Gospel Singers	Released: c. November 1961; Label: Mercury; Format: stereo LP	—
Little Richard Is Back (And There's A Whole Lotta Shakin' Goin' On!)	Released: August 1964; Label: Vee-Jay; Format: mono LP	136
Little Richard's Greatest Hits	Released: c. January 1965; Label: Vee-Jay; Format: mono LP	—
The Explosive Little Richard	Released: January 1967; Label: Okeh; Format: mono LP	—
The Rill Thing	Released: August 1970; Label: Reprise; Format: stereo LP	—
The King of Rock and Roll	Released: 1971; Label: Reprise; Format: stereo-mono LP	—
The Second Coming	Released: 1972; Label: Reprise; Format: stereo LP	—
Right Now!	Released: 1974; Label: United; Format: stereo LP	—
Little Richard Live	Released: 1976; Label: K-Tel; Format: stereo-mono LP (all studio)	—
God's Beautiful City	Released: 1979; Label: Word; Format: stereo LP	—
Lifetime Friend	Released: 1986; Label: WEA Records; Format: stereo LP	—
Shake It All About	Released: 1992; Label: Disney; Format: stereo LP	—
Little Richard Meets Masayoshi Takanaka	Released: 1992; Label: Eastworld; Format: stereo LP	—
Southern Child	Released: 2005 (recorded 1972); Label: Reprise; later released by Rhino Handmade.; Format: stereo LP / CD set	—
"—" denotes releases that did not chart.

== Live albums ==
Title	Album details	Peak chart position	
Title	Album details	US	US R&B
The Incredible Little Richard Sings His Greatest Hits - Live!	Released: 1967; Label: Modern; Format: stereo LP	—	—
Little Richard's Greatest Hits: Recorded Live!	Released: July 1967; Label: Okeh; Format: stereo LP	184	29
"—" denotes releases that did not chart.

== Compilation albums ==
- 1958 Little Richard (with Buck Ram and his Rock 'n Ram Orchestra) (RCA Camden CAL 420)
- 1960: Little Richard Sings: Clap Your Hands (Spinorama M-119)
- 1963: Sings Spirituals (United Records US-7723)
- 1963: His Biggest Hits (Specialty SP-2111)
- 1964: Sings the Gospel
- 1968: The Wild and Frantic Little Richard
- 1967: Rock N Roll Forever
- 1968: Little Richard's Grooviest 17 Original Hits (Specialty SPS-2113)
- 1968: Forever Yours (Roulette)
- 1969: Good Golly Miss Molly
- 1969: Little Richard
- 1970: Every Hour with Little Richard (RCA Camden CAS-2430)
- 1970: Rock Hard Rock Heavy
- 1970: Little Richard
- 1970: Well Alright!
- 1971: Mr. Big
- 1972: The Original
- 1972: Friends from the Beginning – Little Richard and Jimi Hendrix
- 1972: Super Hits (Trip; gatefold)
- 1973: Rip It Up
- 1974: Recorded Live
- 1974: Talkin' 'bout Soul
- 1975: Keep a Knockin'
- 1976: Sings
- 1977: Now
- 1977: 22 Original Hits (Warwick)
- 1983: 20 Greatest Hits (Lotus)
- 1984: Little Richard's Greatest (Kent)
- 1985: 18 Greatest Hits (Rhino)
- 1985: The Essential Little Richard (Specialty)
- 1988: Lucille
- 1991: The Georgia Peach (Specialty)
- 1996: Shag on Down by the Union Hall Featuring Shea Sandlin & Richard "The Sex" Hounsome
- 1996: Little Richard's Grand Slam Hits (DIMI Music Group)
- 2006: Here's Little Richard / Little Richard
- 2008: The Very Best of Little Richard
- 2016: California (I'm Comin')

=== Label overviews ===
- 1989: The Specialty Sessions (Ace [UK], 6-CD; a truncated 3-CD version released in US on Specialty)
- 1996: The Second Coming (Charly [UK]; also released as Dancin' All Around the World – The Complete Vee-Jay Recordings; all previously released, missing alternate take of "I Don't Know What You've Got", and other unreleased material)
- 2004: Get Down With It: The Complete Okeh Sessions (all studio; Columbia)
- 2005: King Of Rock and Roll: The Complete Reprise Sessions (Rhino Handmade)
- 2005: Get Rich Quick – Birth of a Legend, 1951–1954 (RCA Victor, Peacock, Republic material; Rev-Ola)
- 2015: Directly from My Heart: The Best of the Specialty & Vee-Jay Years (Concord Music Group)

== Singles ==
Date	Side	Title	Label Cat. no.	Chart positions			Album
Date	Side	Title	Label Cat. no.	US	US R&B	UK	Album
Nov. 1951	A	"Taxi Blues"	RCA Victor; 20/47-4392	–	–	–	N/A
Nov. 1951	B	"Every Hour"	RCA Victor; 20/47-4392	–	–	–	N/A
Feb. 1952	A	"Get Rich Quick"	RCA Victor; 20/47-4582	–	–	–	N/A
Feb. 1952	B	"Thinkin' 'Bout My Mother"	RCA Victor; 20/47-4582	–	–	–	N/A
May; 1952	A	"Ain't Nothin' Happenin'"	RCA Victor; 20/47-4772	–	–	–	N/A
May; 1952	B	"Why Did You Leave Me"	RCA Victor; 20/47-4772	–	–	–	N/A
Nov. 1952	A	"Please Have Mercy on Me"	RCA Victor; 20/47-5025	–	–	–	N/A
Nov. 1952	B	"I Brought It All on Myself"	RCA Victor; 20/47-5025	–	–	–	N/A
June; 1953	A	"Ain't That Good News" (credit: Duces of Rhythm and Tempo Toppers, lead Little Richard)	Peacock; 1616	–	–	–	N/A
June; 1953	B	"Fool at the Wheel" (credit: Duces of Rhythm and Tempo Toppers, lead Little Richard)	Peacock; 1616	–	–	–	N/A
March; 1954	A	"Always" (credit: Tempo Toppers feat. Little Richard)	Peacock; 1628	–	–	–	N/A
March; 1954	B	"Rice, Red Beans and Turnip Greens" (credit: Tempo Toppers feat. Little Richard)	Peacock; 1628	–	–	–	N/A
Oct. 1955	A	"Tutti Frutti"	Specialty; 561	17	2	29	Here's Little Richard
Oct. 1955	B	"I'm Just a Lonely Guy" (pre-overdub version)	Specialty; 561	–	–	–	The Fabulous Little Richard (with additional backup singer overdubs)
March; 1956	A	"Long Tall Sally"	Specialty; 572	6	1	3	Here's Little Richard
March; 1956	B	"Slippin' and Slidin'"	Specialty; 572	33	2	–	Here's Little Richard
April; 1956	A	"Little Richard's Boogie" (with Johnny Otis' band)	Peacock; 1658	–	–	–	N/A
April; 1956	B	"Directly from My Heart to You" (with Johnny Otis' band)	Peacock; 1658	–	–	–	N/A (re-recorded for The Fabulous Little Richard)
June; 1956	A	"Rip It Up"	Specialty; 579	17	1	30	Here's Little Richard
June; 1956	B	"Ready Teddy"	Specialty; 579	44	8	–	Here's Little Richard
Oct. 1956	A	"Heeby-Jeebies"	Specialty; 584	–	7	–	Little Richard
Oct. 1956	B	"She's Got It"	Specialty; 584	–	9	15	Here's Little Richard
Dec. 1956	A	"The Girl Can't Help It"	Specialty; 591	49	7	9	Little Richard
Dec. 1956	B	"All Around the World"	Specialty; 591	–	13	–	Little Richard
Feb. 1957	A	"Lucille"	Specialty; 598	21	1	10	Little Richard
Feb. 1957	B	"Send Me Some Lovin'"	Specialty; 598	54	3	–	Little Richard
June; 1957	A	"Jenny, Jenny"	Specialty; 606	10	2	11	Here's Little Richard
June; 1957	B	"Miss Ann"	Specialty; 606	56	6	–	Here's Little Richard
July; 1957	A	"Maybe I'm Right" (with Johnny Otis' band)	Peacock; 1673	–	–	–	N/A (re-recorded for The Fabulous Little Richard)
July; 1957	B	"I Love My Baby" (with Johnny Otis' band)	Peacock; 1673	–	–	–	N/A
Aug. 1957	A	"Keep A-Knockin'"	Specialty; 611	8	2	21	Little Richard
Aug. 1957	B	"Can't Believe You Wanna Leave"	Specialty; 611	–	–	–	Here's Little Richard
Jan. 1958	A	"Good Golly, Miss Molly"	Specialty; 624	10	4	8	Little Richard
Jan. 1958	B	"Hey-Hey-Hey-Hey!"	Specialty; 624	–	–	–	Little Richard
May; 1958	A	"Ooh! My Soul"	Specialty; 633	35	15	22	Little Richard
May; 1958	B	"True Fine Mama"	Specialty; 633	68	–	–	Here's Little Richard
July; 1958	A	"Baby Face"	Specialty; 645	41	12	2	Little Richard
July; 1958	B	"I'll Never Let You Go (Boo Hoo Hoo Hoo)"	Specialty; 645	–	–	–	Little Richard
Nov. 1958	A	"She Knows How to Rock"	Specialty; 652	–	–	–	The Fabulous Little Richard
Nov. 1958	B	"Early One Morning"	Specialty; 652	–	–	–	The Fabulous Little Richard
March; 1959	A	"By the Light of the Silvery Moon"	Specialty; 660	–	–	17	Little Richard
March; 1959	B	"Wonderin'"	Specialty; 660	–	–	–	The Fabulous Little Richard
April; 1959	A	"Kansas City"	Specialty; 664	95	–	26	The Fabulous Little Richard
April; 1959	B	"Lonesome and Blue"	Specialty; 664	–	–	–	The Fabulous Little Richard
June; 1959	A	"Shake a Hand"	Specialty; 670	–	–	–	The Fabulous Little Richard
June; 1959	B	"All Night Long"	Specialty; 670	–	–	–	The Fabulous Little Richard
Aug. 1959	A	"Whole Lotta Shakin'"	Specialty; 680	–	–	–	The Fabulous Little Richard
Aug. 1959	B	"Maybe I'm Right"	Specialty; 680	–	–	–	The Fabulous Little Richard
Aug. 1959	A	"I Got It" (similar to "She's Got It")	Specialty; 681	–	–	–	N/A
Aug. 1959	B	"Baby"	Specialty; 681	–	–	–	Here's Little Richard
Sep. 1959	A	"Save Me Lord" (aka "Certainly, Lord")	End; 1057	–	–	–	Pray Along with Little Richard (Vol 2)
Sep. 1959	B	"Troubles of the World"	End; 1057	–	–	–	Pray Along with Little Richard (Vol 2)
Sep. 1959	A	"Milky White Way"	End; 1058	–	–	–	Pray Along with Little Richard (Vol 1)
Sep. 1959	B	"I've Just Come from the Mountain"	End; 1058	–	–	–	Pray Along with Little Richard (Vol 1)
1959	A	"Directly from My Heart to You" (overdubbed)	Specialty; 686	–	–	–	The Fabulous Little Richard
1959	B	"The Most I Can Offer" (overdubbed)	Specialty; 686	–	–	–	The Fabulous Little Richard
Sep. 1961	A	"He's Not Just a Soldier"	Mercury; 71884	113	–	–	The King of the Gospel Singers
Sep. 1961	B	"Joy Joy Joy"	Mercury; 71884	–	–	–	The King of the Gospel Singers
Jan. 1962	A	"Ride On, King Jesus"	Mercury; 71911	–	–	–	The King of the Gospel Singers
Jan. 1962	B	"Do You Care"	Mercury; 71911	–	–	–	The King of the Gospel Singers
May; 1962	A	"He Got What He Wanted (But He Lost What He Had)"	Mercury; 71965	–	–	38	N/A
May; 1962	B	"Why Don't You Change Your Ways"	Mercury; 71965	–	–	–	N/A
Dec. 1962	A	"I'm in Love Again" (credit: The World Famous Upsetters)	Little Star; 123	–	–	–	N/A
Dec. 1962	B	"Every Night About This Time" (credit: The World Famous Upsetters)	Little Star; 123	–	–	–	N/A
Feb. 1963	A	"Crying in the Chapel"	Atlantic; 2181	119	–	–	N/A
Feb. 1963	B	"Hole in the Wall"	Atlantic; 2181	–	–	–	N/A
May; 1963	A	"Traveling Shoes"	Atlantic; 2192	–	–	–	N/A
May; 1963	B	"It Is No Secret"	Atlantic; 2192	–	–	–	N/A
Oct. 1963	A	"Milky White Way"	Coral; 62366	–	–	–	Pray Along with Little Richard (Vol 1)
Oct. 1963	B	"Need Him"	Coral; 62366	–	–	–	Pray Along with Little Richard (Vol 1)
1963	A	"Valley of Tears" (credit: The World Famous Upsetters)	Little Star; 128	–	–	–	N/A
1963	B	"Freedom Ride" (credit: The World Famous Upsetters)	Little Star; 128	–	–	–	N/A
April; 1964	A	"Bama Lama Bama Loo"	Specialty; 692	82	82	20	Well Alright! (overdubbed versions)
April; 1964	B	"Annie Is Back"	Specialty; 692	–	–	–	Well Alright! (overdubbed versions)
Aug. 1964	A	"Whole Lotta Shakin' Goin' On"	Vee Jay; VJ 612	126	42	–	Little Richard is Back (And There's a Whole Lotta Shakin' Goin' On!)
Aug. 1964	B	"Goodnight Irene"	Vee Jay; VJ 612	128	–	–	Little Richard is Back (And There's a Whole Lotta Shakin' Goin' On!)
Nov. 1964	A	"Blueberry Hill"	Vee Jay; VJ 625	–	–	–	Little Richard is Back (And There's a Whole Lotta Shakin' Goin' On!)
Nov. 1964	B	"Cherry Red"	Vee Jay; VJ 625	–	–	–	Little Richard is Back (And There's a Whole Lotta Shakin' Goin' On!)
Feb. 1965	A	"Cross Over"	Vee Jay; VJ-652	–	–	–	N/A
Feb. 1965	B	"It Ain't Whatcha Do (It's the Way How You Do It)"	Vee Jay; VJ-652	–	–	–	N/A
June; 1965	A	"Without Love"	Vee Jay; VJ-665	–	–	–	N/A
June; 1965	B	"Dance What You Wanna"	Vee Jay; VJ-665	–	–	–	N/A
Oct. 1965	A	"I Don't Know What You've Got But It's Got Me - Part I" (first version)	Vee Jay; VJ-698	92	12	–	N/A
Oct. 1965	B	"I Don't Know What You've Got But It's Got Me - Part II"	Vee Jay; VJ-698	–	12	–	N/A
Jan. 1966	A	"Holy Mackerel"	Modern; 45xM 1018	–	–	–	The Wild and Frantic Little Richard
Jan. 1966	B	"Baby, Don't You Want a Man Like Me"	Modern; 45xM 1018	–	–	–	The Wild and Frantic Little Richard
Feb. 1966	A	"Do You Feel It (Part 1)"	Modern; 45xM 1019	–	–	–	The Incredible Little Richard Sings His Greatest Hits - Live! overdubbed w/additional audience sounds
Feb. 1966	B	"Do You Feel It (Part 2)"	Modern; 45xM 1019	–	–	–	The Incredible Little Richard Sings His Greatest Hits - Live! overdubbed w/additional audience sounds
June; 1966	A	"Poor Dog (Who Can't Wag His Own Tail)"	Okeh; 4-7251	121	41	–	The Explosive Little Richard
June; 1966	B	"Well"	Okeh; 4-7251	–	–	–	The Explosive Little Richard
July; 1966	A	"Directly from My Heart"	Modern; 45xM 1022	–	–	–	The Wild and Frantic Little Richard
July; 1966	B	"I'm Back"	Modern; 45xM 1022	–	–	–	The Wild and Frantic Little Richard
Nov. 1966	A	"I Need Love"	Okeh; 4-7262	–	–	–	The Explosive Little Richard
Nov. 1966	B	"The Commandments of Love"	Okeh; 4-7262	–	–	–	The Explosive Little Richard
Jan. 1967	A	"I Don't Want to Discuss It"	Okeh; 4-7271	–	–	–	The Explosive Little Richard
Jan. 1967	B	"Hurry Sundown"	Okeh; 4-7271	–	–	–	The Explosive Little Richard
Feb. 1967	A	"Get Down with It"	Columbia (UK); DB 8116	–	–	–	N/A
Feb. 1967	B	"Rose Mary"	Columbia (UK); DB 8116	–	–	–	N/A
March; 1967	A	"Don't Deceive Me"	Okeh; 4-7278	–	–	–	The Explosive Little Richard
March; 1967	B	"Never Gonna Let You Go"	Okeh; 4-7278	–	–	–	The Explosive Little Richard
June; 1967	A	"A Little Bit of Something (Beats a Whole Lot of Nothing)"	Okeh; 4-7286	–	–	–	N/A
June; 1967	B	"Money"	Okeh; 4-7286	–	–	–	The Explosive Little Richard
1967	A	"Bring It Back Home to Me" (variant of live recording )	Modern; 45xM 1030	–	–	–	The Incredible Little Richard Sings His Greatest Hits - Live!
1967	B	"Slippin' and Slidin'" (1964 recut)	Modern; 45xM 1030	–	–	–	N/A
Nov. 1967	A	"Baby What You Want Me to Do (Part 1)"	Modern; 45xM 1043	–	–	–	The Wild and Frantic Little Richard
Nov. 1967	B	"Baby What You Want Me to Do (Part 2)"	Modern; 45xM 1043	–	–	–	The Wild and Frantic Little Richard
Dec. 1967	A	"Try Some of Mine"	Brunswick; 55362	–	–	–	N/A
Dec. 1967	B	"She's Together"	Brunswick; 55362	–	–	–	N/A
June; 1968	A	"Baby, Don't You Tear My Clothes"	Brunswick; 55377	–	–	–	N/A
June; 1968	B	"Stingy Jenny"	Brunswick; 55377	–	–	–	N/A
Sep. 1968	A	"Soul Train"	Brunswick; 55386	–	–	–	N/A
Sep. 1968	B	"Can I Count on You"	Brunswick; 55386	–	–	–	N/A
March; 1969	A	"Whole Lotta Shakin' Goin' On"	Okeh; 4-7325	–	–	–	Little Richard's Greatest Hits: Recorded Live!
March; 1969	B	"Lucille"	Okeh; 4-7325	–	–	–	Little Richard's Greatest Hits: Recorded Live!
April; 1970	A	"Bama Lama Bama Loo" (overdubbed)	Specialty; 697	–	–	–	Well Alright!
April; 1970	B	"Keep A-Knockin'" (original version)	Specialty; 697	–	–	–	Little Richard
April; 1970	A	"Freedom Blues"	Reprise; 0907	47	28	–	The Rill Thing
April; 1970	B	"Dew Drop Inn"	Reprise; 0907	–	–	–	The Rill Thing
August; 1970	A	"Greenwood, Mississippi"	Reprise; 0942	85	–	–	The Rill Thing
August; 1970	B	"I Saw Her Standing There" (edited)	Reprise; 0942	–	–	–	N/A
Nov. 1970	A	"Poor Boy Paul"	Specialty; 699	–	–	–	Well Alright!
Nov. 1970	B	"Wonderin'" (first version)	Specialty; 699	–	–	–	Well Alright!
March; 1971	A	"Shake a Hand (If You Can)" (Re-recording from 1971)	Reprise; 1005	–	–	–	N/A
March; 1971	B	"Somebody Saw You"	Reprise; 1005	–	–	–	The Rill Thing
Oct. 1971	A	"Green Power"	Reprise; 1043	–	–	–	The King of Rock and Roll
Oct. 1971	B	"Dancing in the Street"	Reprise; 1043	–	–	–	The King of Rock and Roll
Nov. 1972	A	"Mockingbird Sally"	Reprise; REP 1130	–	–	–	The Second Coming
Nov. 1972	B	"Nuki Suki"	Reprise; REP 1130	–	–	–	The Second Coming
1972	A	"Goodnight Irene" (reissue; with Jimi Hendrix [disputed])	ALA; ALA-1175	–	–	–	Friends from the Beginning
1972	B	"Why Don't You Love Me" (1971 recording; not with Hendrix)	ALA; ALA-1175	–	–	–	Friends from the Beginning
May; 1973	A	"Good Golly Miss Molly" (live) (Extended version)	Bell; 2008 189	–	–	–	Let the Good Times Roll (soundtrack)
May; 1973	B	"Lucille" (live)	Bell; 2008 189	–	–	–	Let the Good Times Roll (soundtrack)
June; 1973	A	"In the Middle of the Night"	Greene Mountain; 413	–	71	–	N/A
June; 1973	B	"Where Will I Find a Place to Sleep This Evening"	Greene Mountain; 413	–	–	–	N/A
Feb. 1973	A	"In the Name"	Kent; 4568	–	–	–	Right Now!
Feb. 1973	B	"Don't You Know I"	Kent; 4568	–	–	–	Right Now!
Oct. 1975	A	"Call My Name"	Manticore; 7007	106	–	–	N/A
Oct. 1975	B	"Steal Miss Liza"	Manticore; 7007	–	–	–	N/A
1975	A	"Try to Help Your Brother"	Mainstream; 5572	–	–	–	N/A
1975	B	"Funk Proof"	Mainstream; 5572	–	–	–	N/A
1977	A1	"Good Golly Miss Molly"	Creole; CR 140	–	–	37	Little Richard Live
1977	A2	"Rip It Up"	Creole; CR 140	–	–	–	Little Richard Live
1977	B	"By the Light of the Silvery Moon"	Creole; CR 140	–	–	–	Little Richard Live
Sep. 1983	A	"Chicken Little Baby"	Specialty; 734	–	–	–	The Fabulous Little Richard
Sep. 1983	B	"Oh Why"	Specialty; 734	–	–	–	Here's Little Richard
1985	A	"All Around the World"	Specialty; 736	–	–	–	Little Richard
1985	B	"Heeby-Jeebies-Love"	Specialty; 736	–	–	–	Little Richard
1986	A	"Great Gosh A'Mighty! (It's a Matter of Time)"	MCA; 52780	42	–	62	Down and Out in Beverly Hills (soundtrack)/Lifetime Friend
1986	A	"Operator"	WEA; YZ89	–	–	67	Lifetime Friend
1986	B	"Big House Reunion"	WEA; YZ89	–	–	–	Lifetime Friend
Jan. 1987	A	"Somebody's Comin'"	WEA; YZ98	–	–	93	Lifetime Friend
Jan. 1987	B	"One Ray of Sunshine"	WEA; YZ98	–	–	–	Lifetime Friend
1987	A	"Happy Endings" (with the Beach Boys)	Critique 7-99392	–	–	–	N/A
1988	A	"Twins" (from the original motion picture "Twins") (with Philip Bailey, 3:18)	WTG; 31-08492	–	–	82	N/A
1988	B	"Twins" (from the original motion picture "Twins") (with Philip Bailey, 3:57)	WTG; 31-08492	–	–	82	N/A
"–" denotes releases that did not chart or was not released.

=== Billboard Year-End performances ===
Year	Song	Year-End Position
1956	"Long Tall Sally"	45

== Other appearances ==
Year	Song	Album	Notes
1988	"Rock Island Line"	Folkways: A Vision Shared - A Tribute to Woody Guthrie & Leadbelly	traditional song
1991	"Itsy Bitsy Spider"	For Our Children	traditional song
1993	"Roll Back the Rock (To the Dawn of Time)"	We're Back! A Dinosaur's Story soundtrack	Thomas Dolby song
1994	"Somethin' Else"	Rhythm, Country and Blues	Eddie Cochran cover with Tanya Tucker
1994	"The Magic School Bus (Theme)"	The Magic School Bus	Theme song of the show
1996	"I Feel Pretty"	The Songs of West Side Story	Marni Nixon cover
2002	"Get Rhythm"	Kindred Spirits: A Tribute to the Songs of Johnny Cash	Johnny Cash cover
2008	"I Ain't Never"	The Imus Ranch Record	Mel Tillis cover

=== Guest appearances ===
Year	Song	Album	Artist	Notes
1970	"Miss Ann"	To Bonnie from Delaney	Delaney & Bonnie and Friends	Little Richard played piano on a version of his song "Miss Ann".
1971	"Money Is" and "Do It"	Dollars	Quincy Jones	Featuring vocals by Little Richard.
1972	"He's Not Just a Soldier"	Over the Influence	Mylon LeFevre	Vocals
1975	"Take It Like a Man"	Head On	Bachman-Turner Overdrive	Piano; also played on the Head On track "Stay Alive"
1989	"When Love Comes to Town" (Live from the Kingdom Mix)	"When Loves Comes to Town" B-side	U2 with B.B. King	Little Richard preaches a sermon in rhyming rap style and sings background vocals
1990	"Elvis Is Dead"	Time's Up	Living Colour	Guest rap
1990	"You Really Got Me Now"	Blaze of Glory	Jon Bon Jovi	Piano and duet with Jon Bon Jovi for the soundtrack of the motion picture Young Guns II.
1991	"Voices That Care"	N/A	Voices That Care	As part of a supergroup known as Voices That Care; The single and documentary music video were intended to support the International Red Cross organization.
1993	"The Power"	Duets	Elton John	Duet with Elton John.
1996	"Everybody's Got A Game"	Definition of Soul	Solomon Burke	Duet with Solomon Burke
1997	"Hold On to What You've Got"	Soul-Gasm	Jimmy Lewis	Duet with Jimmy Lewis.
1999	"Keep a-Knockin'"	Why Do Fools Fall in Love soundtrack	Little Richard	New recording of "Keep a-Knockin'"
2006	"I Saw Her Standing There"	Last Man Standing	Jerry Lee Lewis	Plays piano and sings a duet with Jerry Lee Lewis
2012	"But I Try"	Analog Man	Joe Walsh	This recording is from a 1971 session by the James Gang, on which Little Richard sat in on vocals and piano

== Recording sessions ==
=== 1950s ===
The pre-Specialty sessions

RCA Victor sessions: WGST Studio, Atlanta, October 16, 1951, and January 12, 1952

Peacock sessions: Houston, February 25 and October 5, 1953

The Specialty sessions

Little Richard recorded a demonstration tape for Specialty at WBML Studio, Macon, on February 9, 1955. He recorded for Specialty for two years, from September 13, 1955, to October 18, 1957.

When Richard abdicated from rock 'n' roll in late 1957, Specialty was forced to go back to earlier, less rock-oriented recordings they had rejected initially to make future releases. In an effort to make these recordings sound "current", they added a female chorus (and in at least one instance, extra instrumentation) to the basic track.

The Goldner sessions

Several religious tracks were recorded in the summer of 1959 in New York City and released by different labels owned by (or associated with) record industry mogul George Goldner (End, Goldisc, Coral, Spin O Rama, etc.). Three record labels with access to the "dirgelike" tracks later overdubbed drums and other percussion to fill out the sound.

=== 1960s ===
The Little Star sessions

Little Richard recorded six rhythm and blues songs, three Fats Domino vocals and three instrumentals, backed by his 1950s band, the Upsetters, on November 24, 1962, in New York. Two singles were released by Little Star under the name "The World Famous Upsetters".

The Mercury sessions

Little Richard was working for Mercury from June 1961 to March 1962. These recordings have been produced by Quincy Jones and Bumps Blackwell. It appears a second Mercury album was planned but shelved. Richard reached the charts with two single releases.

The Atlantic sessions

The recordings made for Atlantic from June 14, 1962, to April 2, 1963, continue Richard's commitment to religious material. "Crying in the Chapel" was a regional USA hit.

The return to Specialty

In the wake of the "British Invasion" and following a successful tour of England, Richard collected his current guitarist (Glen Willings), the drummer from his New Orleans sessions (Earl Palmer), and old labelmates Don and Dewey and returned to Specialty to start his comeback.

He recorded five tracks (including "Well Alright" and "Bama Lama Bama Loo") in two sessions in March and April 1964. A single was released at the time, and four of the songs were eventually released, with additional overdubs, on the 1970 compilation Well Alright!.

The Vee Jay sessions

Charles White wrote in 1984 that "even with access to the Vee Jay files, information is a bit uncertain in some areas... Of most importance to latter-day rock fans are the cuts that Jimi Hendrix played on, as a member of Richard's touring band. We have singled out those tracks we are relatively sure have Hendrix involvement, although he may have appeared on others."

Little Richard was recording for Vee Jay from June 1964 to at least May–June 1965 (Vee Jay Executive Betty Chiapetta reported in 1982, that Richard recorded several instrumentals for the label). According to Charles White, Jimi Hendrix was playing guitar at least on the first session including such tracks as "Whole Lotta Shakin' Goin' On", "Hound Dog", "Lawdy Miss Clawdy", "Money Honey", "Goodnight Irene" and others, released on the album Little Richard Is Back. Hendrix played on at least nine tracks on the second LR Vee Jay album of '50s remakes. Among the notable Richard-Hendrix songs were "I Don't Know What You've Got (But It's Got Me)", a soul hit in late 1965, and "Dancing All Around the World" (aka "Dance a Go Go"), and "You'd Better Stop", recorded in New York City May or June, '65.

The Modern sessions

Little Richard was recording for the Modern Records label from December 1965 to January 1966.

The Modern recordings are demos, studio warm-ups, tapes supplied by Richard, and actual Modern sessions. Two albums were issued; all tracks of the first one, The Incredible Little Richard Sings His Greatest Hits - Live!, have an overdubbed audience to enhance a live shows done at The Domino, a club in Atlanta, Georgia, December 1, 1965.

There are at least six tracks still unreleased (including "Try Me", "I Got a Woman", "Good-Bye So Long" [aka "Goodbye Baby"], "Satisfaction", "Baby Face", "High Heel Sneakers"). Two songs are leftovers from Vee Jay Records, an extended version of "Groovy Little Suzy" and a studio version of "Slippin' and Slidin'", both from August 1964. It appears that a third, "Do the Jerk" [aka "Get Down With It"], was recorded in November 1964 in Nashville with Jimi Hendrix.

The Okeh sessions

A contemporary mix of pop, jazz, and soul studio tracks and a charting, in-studio-with-audience live set highlight Richard's Okeh period from February 5, 1966, to May 17, 1967 at Hollywood and (in December 1966) at Abbey Road Studios. Penniman's long-time friend, musician Larry Williams produced the pair of albums.

The Brunswick sessions

Richard recorded six tracks for Brunswick in 1967–68. Three singles have been released.

=== Later years ===
The Reprise sessions

The Reprise era was the commercial peak of Richard's comeback, highlighted by numerous television talk show appearances. The sessions took place from March 11, 1970, to April 1972. (Reprise files mention a 1969 session in Los Angeles, for Blackwell Productions; no song titles available). Sessions yielded two hit singles and one hit album. Some tracks from April 1971 first appeared under alternate titles for the Ala label.

Miscellaneous sessions

Little Richard recorded three tracks for the film Let the Good Times Roll circa late 1972, for United Records in January 1973, and for other labels in 1973–75. He re-recorded his mid-50s and mid-60s Specialty hits for K-tel in 1976. In 1979, Koala Records issued what sounds like an early 1970s performance. In 1979, he recorded the gospel album God's Beautiful City, issued by Word Records. In 1985 and 1986, he recorded the album Lifetime Friend, issued by Warner Bros.
