= Little Richard's Greatest Hits =

- UK album cover

Studio album by Little Richard
- Released: January 1965
- Recorded: Nashville & New York City, November–December 1964
- Genre: Rock and roll
- Length: 27:54
- Label: Vee-Jay
- Producers: Joe Fields, Olsie Richard Robinson

Little Richard chronology
Little Richard Is Back (And There's A Whole Lotta Shakin' Goin' On!) (1964)	Little Richard's Greatest Hits (1965)	The Incredible Little Richard Sings His Greatest Hits – Live! (1966)

Little Richard's Greatest Hits (with various titles and cover art) is an album of Little Richard songs re-recorded in 1964 and first released in the US by Vee-Jay Records in January 1965. It features updated versions of twelve of his best-known songs originally recorded in the 1950s for Specialty Records. Some of these re-recordings use different musical arrangements, including unusual syncopation, tambourine and jazz horns.

== Background ==
Little Richard recorded forty-six songs for Vee-Jay Records, but nearly half of them were unreleased when the company filed for bankruptcy in January 1966. Eventually, they were compiled onto albums, such as: Mr. Big (1971), Rip It Up (1973) and Talkin' 'Bout Soul (1974).

During the brief time Jimi Hendrix toured with Richard, he recorded at least twelve songs: “I Don't Know What You Got (But It's Got Me)”, “Dancing All Around the World” (aka “Dance A Go Go”) and “You Better Stop”, are perhaps the only ones beyond a December, 1964 session of remakes. Claims have been made over the years that Hendrix played on more Richard recordings. One substantiated claim is that Hendrix and childhood mentor Esquerita played on the recut sessions in New York. The latter in “Good Golly, Miss Molly” and “Slippin' and Slidin'”.

== Critical reception ==
Professional ratings
Review scores
Source	Rating
Record Mirror	3/5 stars

According to Little Richard biographer Charles White, both the recordings and Richard's erratic persona of the time are regarded as low points in his career: "blinded by commercial considerations, they [Vee-Jay] rushed the session without concern for quality. The result was dreadful." AllMusic critic William Ruhlmann noted "Little Richard is in much rougher voice than he was when he did the originals, but he remains a spirited performer. Just don't buy this album thinking you are getting the hit versions of these songs!"

== Track listing ==
1. "Good Golly, Miss Molly" (John Marascalco, Robert Blackwell) (2:07)
2. "Baby Face" (Harry Akst, Benny Davis) (2:33)
3. "Tutti Frutti" (Dorothy LaBostrie, Richard Penniman a.k.a. Little Richard) (2:24)
4. "Send Me Some Lovin'" (Marascalco, Leo Price) (2:19)
5. "The Girl Can't Help It" (Bobby Troup) (3:02)
6. "Lucille" (Al Collins, Penniman) (2:16)
7. "Slippin' and Slidin'" (Penniman) (2:26)
8. "Keep A Knockin'" (Penniman) (2:15)
9. "Rip It Up" (Marascalco, Blackwell) (2:02)
10. "She's Got It" (Marascalco, Penniman) (2:11)
11. "Ooh! My Soul" (Penniman) (2:17)
12. "Long Tall Sally" (Earl Johnson, Blackwell, Penniman) (2:03)
