= Hey-Hey-Hey-Hey! =

"Hey-Hey-Hey-Hey"

Single by Little Richard
- A-side: "Good Golly, Miss Molly"
- Released: January 1958
- Recorded: May 9, 1956
- Studio: J&M (New Orleans, Louisiana)
- Genre: R&B, rock and roll
- Length: 2:02
- Label: Specialty
- Songwriter: Richard Penniman a.k.a. Little Richard
- Producer: Bumps Blackwell

Little Richard singles chronology
"Keep A-Knockin'" (1957)	"Hey-Hey-Hey-Hey" (1958)	"Ooh! My Soul" (1958)

The song "Hey-Hey-Hey-Hey", also known as "Hey-Hey-Hey-Hey! (Goin' Back to Birmingham)", was written by Little Richard and recorded on May 9, 1956 at J&M Studio, New Orleans, Louisiana, (supervised by Bumps Blackwell).

== Recording and releases ==
In 1955, Little Richard recorded two different versions of "Kansas City" by Jerry Leiber and Mike Stoller: one on September 13 (supervised by Bumps Blackwell), and one on November 29 (with five vocalists, supervised by Art Rupe). The first version, which adheres closely to the original 1952 recording by Little Willie Littlefield for the first two verses, was not released until November 1970, on the compilation album Well Alright! The second version, which had been substantially re-worked by Little Richard (in particular, it featured a new refrain starting with words, "Hey, hey, hey, hey; Hey baby, hey child, hey now") was released in March 1959 on The Fabulous Little Richard and in April 1959 as single after the success of the Wilbert Harrison hit.

"Hey-Hey-Hey-Hey" was recorded six months after the second version of "Kansas City", incorporating the same refrain. However, as "Hey-Hey-Hey-Hey" was released in 1958 – with the writing credited solely to Richard Wayne Penniman (Little Richard) – the public perceived it as an earlier recording than "Kansas City".

In January 1958, Specialty Records released the song as B-side of "Good Golly, Miss Molly" and, in July 1958, on the compilation Little Richard.

=== Personnel ===
- Little Richard – vocal, piano
- Lee Allen – leader, tenor saxophone
- Alvin "Red" Tyler – baritone saxophone
- Edgar Blanchard – guitar
- Ernest McLean – guitar
- Frank Fields – bass
- Earl Palmer – drums

== Cover versions ==
The Beatles performed the song as early as September 5, 1962, at the Cavern Club in Liverpool, and in December of that year at the Star-Club in Hamburg. In 1964, the group released the albums Beatles for Sale (UK) and Beatles VI (US) featuring an arrangement of "Kansas City" based on the issued Little Richard version. Gene Vincent covered this song on his album Shakin' up a Storm in 1964, accompanied by the Shouts.

"Hey-Hey-Hey-Hey" was recorded by Bob Seger during the recording session that produced his cover of Fats Domino's "Blue Monday" for the 1989 Road House soundtrack album. Seger's take remained unreleased until 2011, when it was released as the lead single on the retrospective album Ultimate Hits: Rock and Roll Never Forgets.
