= The Incredible Little Richard Sings His Greatest Hits – Live! =

Live album by Little Richard
- Released: 1967
- Recorded: December 1965/January 1966 (Do You Feel It? - studio)
- Genre: Rock and roll
- Label: Modern Records
- Producer: Robert Blackwell, Richard Penniman

Little Richard chronology
Little Richard's Greatest Hits (1965)	The Incredible Little Richard Sings His Greatest Hits – Live! (1967)	The Wild and Frantic Little Richard (1967)

The Incredible Little Richard Sings His Greatest Hits – Live! is the first of two albums Little Richard made for the Modern Records label. A live recording from the Domino Club in Atlanta compiled from more than one concert, all the tracks on the album have overdubbed audience noises.

Ace Records has yet to release these (plus several never issued tracks) on CD (except one, Directly From My Heart to You). Ace reports a legal entanglement prohibiting unreleased songs, including "Good bye, so long"; "Try Me"; "Roll Over Beethoven"; "High-Heeled Sneakers" and "I Got a Woman".

== Track listing ==
1. Introduction
2. "Tutti Frutti"
3. "Keep a Knockin'"
4. "Rip It Up” (mis-titled as “Saturday Night Rock”)
5. "Jenny Jenny" (Enotris Johnson, Richard Penniman)
6. "Bama Lama Bama Loo"
7. "Long Tall Sally" (Enotris Johnson, Richard Penniman, Robert Blackwell)
8. "Ready Teddy"
9. "Slippin' and Slidin'" (possibly a rehearsal tape)
10. "True Fine Mama"
11. "Bonnie Marone (Bony Moronie) (Bony Maronie)”
12. "Lucille"
13. "Bring It On Home to Me (mis-titled as “Bring It Back Home to Me)"
14. "Do You Feel It" (a.k.a. Do You Feel It ( The Second Line)”
15. "Whole Lotta Shakin' Goin' On"

== Personnel ==
- Little Richard – vocals, piano

Incomplete personnel listed in Modern archives - the backing band given are Little Richard's backing band, The Upsetters.
