= Here's Little Richard =

Studio album by Little Richard
- Released: March 4, 1957
- Recorded: September 14, 1955 – October 15, 1956
- Studios: J & M Studio (New Orleans); Radio Recorders and Master Recorders (Los Angeles)
- Genres: Rock and roll; rhythm and blues
- Length: 28:30
- Label: Specialty
- Producer: Bumps Blackwell

Little Richard chronology
Here's Little Richard (1957)	Little Richard (1958)

Singles from Here's Little Richard
- 1. "Tutti Frutti" Released: October 1955; 2. "Long Tall Sally/Slippin' and Slidin'" Released: March 1956; 3. "Rip It Up / Ready Teddy" Released: June 1956; 4. "She's Got It" Released: October 1956; 5. "Jenny, Jenny/Miss Ann" Released: June 1957; 6. "True Fine Mama" Released: May 1958

Here's Little Richard is the debut studio album by the American musician Little Richard, released on March 4, 1957. Promoted as "six of Little Richard's hits and six brand new songs of hit calibre", the album compiles many of the A-sides and B-sides from Richard's hit singles including the Billboard top 40 entries "Tutti Frutti", "Long Tall Sally", "Slippin' and Slidin'", "Rip It Up" and "Jenny, Jenny" and the top 10 Rhythm and Blues Best-Sellers hits "Ready Teddy", "She's Got It" and "Miss Ann".

The album's twelve tracks were produced by Robert "Bumps" Blackwell and recorded in New Orleans and Los Angeles in a highly collaborative process. Several of the songs included have been characterised as innovative and important in the development of rock and roll. Here's Little Richard was Richard's highest charting album, peaking at 13 on the Billboard Pop Albums chart. In the years since its release, the album has been included in several lists of the greatest albums of all time including those by Rolling Stone and Time. In 2025, Uncut ranked it as the greatest album of the 1950s.

== Background ==
Little Richard first achieved success after signing to Art Rupe's label Specialty Records and releasing the single "Tutti Frutti". A self-composed number which Richard had been performing live for some time, "Tutti Frutti" was recorded at J & M Studio, New Orleans in September 1955 after producer Robert "Bumps" Blackwell had Richard's ribald lyrics revised by songwriter Dorothy LaBostrie. The song's hollered refrain (often transcribed as "a-wop-bop-a-loo-mop-a-lop-bam-boom!"), hard-driving sound and unconventional lyrics became a model for many future Little Richard songs. Richard accompanies himself on piano on the song, playing eight-note patterns that have been cited as an innovation in rhythm and blues. In 2012, musicologist Lee Hildebrand stated "swing and shuffle beats had been the primary pulse of rhythm & blues until Richard introduced the even eights that would come to drive most R&B and rock music". Issued as a single in November 1955, "Tutti Frutti" was an instant hit, reaching No. 2 on Billboard magazine's Rhythm and Blues Best-Sellers chart and crossing over to the pop charts in both the United States and overseas in the United Kingdom.

In the wake of his single’s success, Richard travelled to Los Angeles and recorded demos at Specialty's offices, Radio Recorders and Ted Brinson's studio before returning to J & M. His style of working was marked by grinding rehearsals and close collaboration with Art Rupe, Bumps Blackwell, and recording engineer and studio owner Cosimo Matassa. The follow-up to "Tutti Frutti", "Long Tall Sally", was initially titled "The Thing" and was cut three times on different dates before Rupe was satisfied. In addition to the hallmarks carried over from "Tutti Frutti" such as Richard's falsetto "woo"s and his hammering boogie-woogie-styled piano, "Long Tall Sally" features a rapid fire vocal delivery. The song topped the Rhythm and Blues chart and its B-side, "Slippin' and Slidin'", reached No. 2. Richard's next single "Rip It Up / Ready Teddy" was his third million-seller, while "She's Got It" was another Rhythm & Blues top ten. By the end of 1956, Richard's success had led to appearances in the rock and roll films Don't Knock the Rock and The Girl Can't Help It. His frantic performance style saw him described as a "whirling dervish of modern entertainment" by Melody Maker.

== Contents ==
Here's Little Richard was Specialty's first 12-inch LP. Assembled by Art Rupe, the album compiles Richard's six hit songs from 1955–56 alongside six previously unreleased cuts with each recording featuring his distinctive "totally untameable, anarchic vocal style" pushed forward. Among the new songs on the album, "Can't Believe You Wanna Leave" has been described as a "chugging blues lament" that, along with "Oh Why", resembles the "sedentary style of Fats Domino". The tender "Baby" has been likened to the work of Clyde McPhatter and the Drifters. "Miss Ann" alludes to Ann Howard, a Macon woman who ran the club Ann's Tic Toc Room. All of the songs on Here's Little Richard were recorded in New Orleans with the exception of "True, Fine Mama" and "She's Got It", both made in Los Angeles. The single "Jenny, Jenny/Miss Ann" was released from the album in June 1957. "Jenny, Jenny", described by Record Collector as a "joyous celebration of womanhood", peaked at number ten on the US Billboard Hot 100 and reached number two on the Hot Rhythm and Blues Singles chart.

== Release ==
Here's Little Richard was issued by Specialty on March 4, 1957, both as a 12-inch LP (SP-100) and as a series of three EPs (SEP-400, 401 and 402 respectively). According to author George Plasketes, the album felt "fresh but familiar" to listeners because, as it contained previously released hits, it bore similarities to a greatest hits album. The album spent five weeks on the Billboard Top LPs chart and peaked at number thirteen. It was Richard's only album to make the US top twenty. "True, Fine Mama" was released as a single in 1958 and again reached both the Billboard pop and R&B charts. The album was issued by Regency in Canada and London Records in the United Kingdom, Australia, New Zealand, South Africa and Brazil. In 1989, Ace issued The Specialty Sessions, a six-disc boxset compiling demos, outtakes and masters from Richard's time with Specialty. On April 17, 2012, Concord issued an expanded edition of Here's Little Richard, adding demo versions of two tracks and a nine-minute interview with Art Rupe. On November 3, 2017, Concord's Craft Recordings label released a 2-disc 60th anniversary edition featuring 22 bonus tracks.

== Critical reception and legacy ==
Professional ratings
Review scores
Source	Rating
AllMusic	4.5/5 stars
Encyclopedia of Popular Music	5/5 stars
Music Story	4.5/5 stars
Record Collector	4/5 stars
The Rolling Stone Album Guide	4/5 stars

Reviewing Here's Little Richard upon its release, Billboard praised the "striking" cover art and commented "Richard's frantic up-tempo wailings will definitely be greeted enthusiastically by the jive set". Cash Box described the album as a "refresher course of previous R&R smashes", noting "with hardly a spare breath, the young entertainer belts out some of his biggest hits". A less favourable notice came from the Duncannon Record, whose anonymous reviewer commented "the full treatment did not altogether convince me that rock is my salvation in the realm of the arts. But I will admit I could follow the beat and there were times when I was able to suppress my spleen long enough to allow my foot to tap".

Among retrospective reviews, Mark Deming of AllMusic commented that "these 12 tunes may not represent the alpha and omega of Little Richard's best music, but every song is a classic and unlike many of his peers, time has refused to render this first album quaint -- Richard's grainy scream remains one of the great sounds in rock & roll history, and the thunder of his piano and the frantic wail of the band is still the glorious call of a Friday night with pay in the pocket and trouble in mind". Writing for Time in 2010, Alan Light described the album as "glorious anarchy, let loose by a crack team of New Orleans musicians with the most distinctive, most outrageous voice of them all leading the charge". Reviewing the album's 2012 reissue, Terry Staunton of Record Collector deemed the album's "raucous rockers" still startling and "rarely equalled for their flash and ferocity". In 2014, Classic Rock's Matt Stock wrote "every track on Here's Little Richard is a stone-cold classic".

In 2003, the album was ranked number 50 on Rolling Stone magazine's list of the 500 greatest albums of all time, maintaining the rating in a 2012 revised list, but dropping to number 227 in the 2020 revision. It is included in the book 1001 Albums You Must Hear Before You Die and Time listed it in the Top 100 Albums of All Time in 2010. In the former, writer Michael Lydon described Here's Little Richard as a "flat-out classic" and further described it as "rock 'n' roll's stem cells" in that it was one of only a few albums from which "the whole genre grew". Similarly, Plasketes wrote that the record's songs impacted the vocals and performance styles of performers including Otis Redding, James Brown, Richard Berry, Etta James, Big Al Downing and Thurston Harris, while noting that the record's more animated songs would later attract interpreters such as John Lennon, Paul McCartney, John Fogerty, Mitch Ryder and the Rolling Stones. The opening track "Tutti Frutti" was listed as number 43 in Rolling Stone's 500 Greatest Songs of All Time. Richard later recorded new versions of the album's songs for other labels.

In 2025, Uncut ranked Here's Little Richard at number one in their list of "The 500 Greatest Albums of the 1950s". Contributor Bud Scoppa wrote how "the self described king – and queen – of rock'n'roll [drew up] the grand blueprint, settting into motion the transformation of popular music."

== Track listing ==
Side one
No.	Title	Writer(s)	Length
1.	"Tutti Frutti"	Richard Penniman; Dorothy LaBostrie	2:25
2.	"True, Fine Mama"	Penniman	2:43
3.	"Can't Believe You Wanna Leave"	Leo Price	2:28
4.	"Ready Teddy"	Robert Blackwell; John Marascalco	2:09
5.	"Baby"	Penniman	2:06
6.	"Slippin' and Slidin'"	Penniman; Eddie Bocage; Al Collins; James Smith	2:42

Side two
No.	Title	Writer(s)	Length
7.	"Long Tall Sally"	Enotris Johnson; Blackwell; Penniman	2:10
8.	"Miss Ann"	Penniman; Johnson	2:17
9.	"Oh Why?"	Winfield Scott	2:09
10.	"Rip It Up"	Blackwell; Marascalco	2:23
11.	"Jenny, Jenny"	Johnson; Penniman	2:04
12.	"She's Got It"	Marascalco; Penniman	2:26
Total length:			28:30

=== 2012 bonus tracks ===
13. "Baby" (Demo) (Penniman) – 4:22
14. "All Night Long" (Demo) (Penniman) – 2:49
15. "Interview with Specialty Records Founder Art Rupe" (Paul Jones) – 9:13

=== 2017 bonus tracks ===
13. "Tutti Frutti" (Take 2) (Penniman, LaBostrie) – 1:31
14. "True Fine Mama" (Incomplete Take) (Penniman) – 1:11
15. "Can't Believe You Wanna Leave" (Take 6) (Price) – 2:25
16. "Can't Believe You Wanna Leave" (Take 8) (Price) – 2:23
17. "Ready Teddy" (Take 1) (Blackwell, Marascalco) – 1:32
18. "Ready Teddy" (Takes 2 & 3) (Blackwell, Marascalco) – 2:09
19. "Baby" (Demo) (Penniman) – 4:18
20. "Baby" (Take 1) (Penniman) – 2:22
21. "Slippin' and Slidin'" (Demo) – 1:47
22. "Slippin' and Slidin'" (Piano & Drums Demo) – 1:57
23. "Long Tall Sally" (Take 1) (Johnson, Blackwell, Penniman) – 2:01
24. "Long Tall Sally" (Take 6) (Johnson, Blackwell, Penniman) – 2:07
25. "Miss Ann" (Demo) (Penniman, Johnson) – 1:43
26. "Miss Ann" (Take 1) (Penniman, Johnson) – 2:29
27. "Miss Ann" (Take 6) (Penniman, Johnson) – 2:51
28. "Oh Why?" (Takes 3 & 4) (Scott) – 2:23
29. "Oh Why?" (Take 9) (Scott) – 2:14
30. "Rip It Up" (Take 1) (Blackwell, Marascalco) – 1:15
31. "Rip It Up" (Take 3) (Blackwell, Marascalco) – 2:20
32. "Rip It Up" (Take 4) (Blackwell, Marascalco) – 1:48
33. "Rip It Up" (Take 6) (Blackwell, Marascalco) – 3:10
34. "She's Got It" (Alternate Version) (Marascalco, Penniman) – 2:28

== Personnel ==
- Little Richard – vocals, piano (except on 5 and 9)
- Lee Allen – tenor saxophone (except on 2 and 12)
- Alvin "Red" Tyler – baritone saxophone (except on 2 and 12)
- Frank Fields – bass (except on 2 and 12)
- Earl Palmer – drums (except on 2 and 12)
- Edgar Blanchard – guitar (except on 1, 2, 5, 9 and 12)

=== Additional personnel ===
- Justin Adams – guitar on 1 and 5
- Huey Smith – piano on 5
- Renald Richard – trumpet on 2
- Clarence Ford – tenor sax, baritone sax on 2
- Joe Tillman – tenor sax on 2
- William "Frosty" Pyles – guitar on 2
- Lloyd Lambert – bass on 2
- Oscar Moore – drums on 2
- Roy Montrell – guitar on 9
- Wilbert Smith – tenor sax on 12
- Grady Gaines – tenor sax on 12
- Clifford Burks – tenor sax on 12
- Jewell Grant – baritone sax on 12
- Nathaniel Douglas – guitar on 12
- Olsie Richard Robinson – bass on 12
- Charles Connor – drums on 12

== Charts ==
=== Weekly ===
Year	Chart	Position
1957	Billboard Pop Albums	13

=== Singles ===
Year	Single	Chart	Position
1955	"Tutti Frutti"	Billboard Black Singles	2
1955	"Tutti Frutti"	Billboard Pop Singles	21
1956	"Long Tall Sally"	Billboard Black Singles	1
1956	"Long Tall Sally"	Billboard Pop Singles	6
1956	"Ready Teddy"	Billboard Black Singles	8
1956	"Ready Teddy"	Billboard Pop Singles	44
1956	"Rip It Up"	Billboard Black Singles	1
1956	"Rip It Up"	Billboard Pop Singles	17
1957	"Jenny, Jenny"	Billboard Black Singles	2
1957	"Jenny, Jenny"	Billboard Pop Singles	10
1957	"Miss Ann"	Billboard Black Singles	6
1957	"Miss Ann"	Billboard Pop Singles	56
1957	"True Fine Mama"	Billboard Black Singles	15
1957	"True Fine Mama"	Billboard Pop Singles	68

== See also ==
- Little Richard discography
