= The Rill Thing =

Studio album by Little Richard
- Released: August 1970
- Recorded: 11 March – 2 June 1970
- Studio: FAME Studios, Muscle Shoals, Alabama
- Genre: Rock and roll, soul, R&B
- Length: 39:22
- Label: Reprise
- Producer: Little Richard

Little Richard chronology
Little Richard's Greatest Hits: Recorded Live! (1967)	The Rill Thing (1970)	Mr. Big (1971)

Singles from The Rill Thing
- 1. "Freedom Blues" Released: April 1970; 2. "Greenwood, Mississippi" Released: August 1970

The Rill Thing is Little Richard's first album for Reprise Records, released in August 1970. It was considered a comeback album for Richard, following a three-year hiatus on new albums and an acclaimed performance at Atlantic City Pop Festival. The album utilizes a soul-influenced sound and contains Little Richard's biggest post-Specialty single in "Freedom Blues", which broke the Billboard top 50. The follow-up single, "Greenwood, Mississippi" made the top 100 and number 56 on Cashbox Black Singles. Despite the success of the singles, the album failed to chart.

== Background ==
In 1970, three years had passed since the last new material from Little Richard. Richard signed with Okeh Records in early 1966, and released two new albums on the label in 1967; The Explosive Little Richard, which utilised a Motown-influenced sound and featured no songs written by Richard, and Little Richard's Greatest Hits: Recorded Live!. Both were produced by Larry Williams but the alliance was troubled; Richard would describe Williams as "the worst producer in the world". Feeling he wasn't given enough respect or support from the label, Richard left Okeh in 1967. Richard then signed with Brunswick Records but clashed with the label over musical direction, leaving it the following year and turning his focus to live performance. Appearing at the Atlantic City Pop Festival in August 1969, Richard "revived his own legend" according to David Dalton of Rolling Stone. His appearance the following month at Toronto Rock and Roll Revival was similarly well received. These successes brought Little Richard to talk shows such as The Tonight Show Starring Johnny Carson and The Dick Cavett Show, making him a prominent celebrity again. Richard felt "the music business runs in a cycle and my time has come around again". Richard received offers from many record labels including the Beatles' Apple. Aiming to cross over to both black rhythm and blues and white rock audiences, he accepted an offer from Reprise Records. Richard was the first major signing negotiated by Mo Ostin in his position as president of Reprise.

== Composition ==
=== Musical style ===
The time is right for Little Richard to re-enter the recording field in a big way. The sound he is getting in Muscle Shoals is very close to the sound of his early records, but his performing style is highly relevant to present day music.

— Mo Ostin, 1970

The Rill Thing was Little Richard's first self-produced album. Richard is reported to have been focused on the material and even invested his own money in the project. Richard described the album as "the only thing I’ve done since I was back in the business that I think is really good", referring to his work since he ceased recording gospel music. Though many of the songs use twelve-bar blues structures like Richard's earlier rock and roll work, the arrangements are more informed by the contemporary soul and R&B music of the time. Reflecting on the album's sound, Little Richard commented "the bass riffs are more predominant, the guitar you'll notice is more out front. The voice is just riding on the rhythm, it's a force and a funk, and it's clean, it's not gutty-gut but it's clean". Reviewing the album in 2009, Kev Boyd of Fatea Magazine described its style as consisting of "blues-inflected R&B, hints of Sly Stone-lite funk, the occasional rambling instrumental and Richard's characteristic scream-singing".

=== Songs ===
The album opener Freedom Blues features a message of brotherhood. Richard felt the song's inclusive theme was important to its success, commenting "it's catchy, the little thing is catchy, and the message is universal. It's not like "black people you gotta be free!" I didn’t say that. Everybody, everybody got to be free". Richard's stance had not been universally popular; his insistence on performing in front of integrated audiences at the time of the black liberation movement shortly after the Watts riots and the formation of the Black Panthers had caused many black radio DJs in certain areas of the United States, including Los Angeles, to choose not to play his music. "Greenwood, Mississippi" was written by Travis Wammack, whom Richard met at FAME Studios. Wammack told Richard he had recorded a demo of a song that was a cross between Richard’s style and John Fogerty of Creedence Clearwater Revival. After sitting in Wammack's truck to listen to the demo cassette, Richard decided to record the song. Richard insisted he record his vocals over the cassette recording, to FAME owner Rick Hall's chagrin. Travis Wammack released his own recording of the song on his 1975 Capricorn Records album Not For Sale.

Little Richard in 1970

Several longtime associates of Little Richard contributed to the album. Robert "Bumps" Blackwell, who had produced Richard's 1950s recordings for Specialty, is credited as a co-writer on "Spreadin' Natta, What's The Matter?" alongside Maybelle Jackson, who collaborated with Richard on the lyrics; Jackson had previously contributed lyrics to "Heeby-Jeebies". Esquerita, an R&B singer, songwriter and pianist whose frenetic performances and flamboyant stage persona influenced Richard, co-wrote "Freedom Blues" and "Dew Drop Inn". "Dew Drop Inn" borrows the drum beat from Richard's recording of "Keep A-Knockin'" for its intro. According to All About Jazz, the song revisits "conventional Little Richard terrain: the patent scream, rollicking piano and booting sax solo of his earliest hits". Travis Wammack felt Richard was at the peak of his vocal prowess at this time, commenting "He was just singing his booty off!". The second side of The Rill Thing opens with its title track, a ten minute instrumental jam featuring Richard on electric piano.

The album concludes with two covers; the first is a version of "Lovesick Blues" in what has been described as a New Orleans rhythm. "Lovesick Blues", a show tune written by Cliff Friend and Irving Mills, is most associated with Hank Williams who recorded a country cover of the song in 1949. It was a staple of Little Richard's live performances at this time alongside the Williams song "Your Cheatin' Heart". Richard commented in 1970; "I don't just do the country sound, I make it mine, you understand, I sing it with an R&B rhythm and it makes it into something else". The final track is a cover of the Beatles "I Saw Her Standing There", a song Richard considered to have been inspired by his music. Richard's version is played at a slower tempo to the original and features a horn section. Little Richard met the Beatles when they supported him on a 1962 European tour, and considered the band "some of the greatest songwriters ever been".

== Release ==
The album was released in August 1970. The cover shot of Little Richard in performance was taken by Ed Caraeff. The album's back cover features an essay describing the album as "the first accurately dazzling reflection of his talent since his beginnings on the Specialty label" and its record labels bear the slogan "The Little Richard Sound". The album was preceded by lead single "Freedom Blues", which became a Billboard top 50 hit, peaking at number 47 on 11 July 1970. It was Little Richard's biggest American pop hit in thirteen years. In Canada the song reached number 70. The album's second single "Greenwood, Mississippi" was less successful; it charted at number 85 on the Billboard chart and number 56 on the Cashbox Black Singles chart. Despite Reprise's promotional efforts and the charting singles, The Rill Thing was a commercial failure and failed to chart in either the United States or United Kingdom. The album made its CD debut in June 2009 as part of a reissue campaign of Little Richard's Reprise albums by Collectors' Choice Music. Collector's Choice ceased releasing recordings the following year. A new CD issue of the album by Omnivore Recordings with four bonus tracks was released on 18 September 2020.

== Critical reception ==
Professional ratings
Review scores
Source	Rating
AllMusic	3.5/5 stars
Encyclopedia of Popular Music	2/5 stars

Upon release, The Rill Thing received positive reviews. Billboard described the album as a "stomping, swinging, soulful leap backwards in the rock 'n' rolling '50s with the Muscle Shoals gang". Joel Selvin of Rolling Stone considered the album "a major artistic triumph for Little Richard" that "faithfully exhibits Richard's maturity as an artist both through the selection of material and the contemporary instrumental setting". Selvin praised Richard's vocals and the covers of "Lovesick Blues" and "I Saw Her Standing There", and deemed the album "a most significant chapter in the living legend of the greatest rock and roll singer ever".

Among retrospective reviews, William Ruhlmann of AllMusic described The Rill Thing as "a convincing update" on Little Richard's earlier work, despite "the rambling ten-minute instrumental title track". Reviewing the album upon its 2009 reissue, Doug Sheppard of PopMatters considered The Rill Thing to be "at least partially successful" at updating Richard's sound, remarking that the album "retains Richard’s forceful singing, but augments it with bluesy, funky soul rather than his trademark manic R&B". He was critical of the title track, and considered Richard's version of "I Saw Her Standing There" "surprisingly ineffectual". Kev Boyd of Fatea Magazine was similarly critical of the album's second side, considering the title track "all deep bass and blues harp but little in the way of inspiration" and describing the version of "Lovesick Blues" as "ill-advised". In an article about the album for Shindig! in 2020, Martin Ruddock wrote that The Rill Thing "remains a high point in one hell of a catalogue".

== Track listing ==
=== Side one ===
1. "Freedom Blues" (Richard Penniman, Esquerita) - 3:01
2. "Greenwood, Mississippi" (Travis Wammack, Albert S. Lowe Jr.) – 3:32
3. "Two-Time Loser" (Larry Lee) – 3:20
4. "Dew Drop Inn" (Richard Penniman, Esquerita, Keith Winslow) – 2:41
5. "Somebody Saw You" (Richard Penniman) – 3:39
6. "Spreadin' Natta, What's The Matter?" (Richard Penniman, Robert "Bumps" Blackwell, Maybelle Jackson) – 4:37

=== Side two ===
1. "The Rill Thing" (Richard Penniman) – 10:27
2. "Lovesick Blues" (Cliff Friend, Irving Mills) – 4:34
3. "I Saw Her Standing There" (John Lennon, Paul McCartney) – 3:31

== Personnel ==
=== Tracks 1, 4, 7 ===
- Little Richard – vocals, piano

Rest of personnel unknown, records not kept by Reprise.

=== Tracks 3, 5, 7, 8, 9 ===
- Little Richard – vocals, piano
- Harrison Callay – trumpet
- Ronnie Eader – baritone saxophone
- Harry Thompson – tenor saxophone
- Charles Rose – trombone
- Clayton Ivey – piano
- Jerry Masters – bass
- Travis Wammack – guitar
- Albert Lowe – guitar
- Roger Hawkins – drums
- Eddie Fletcher – bass
- Jesse Boyce – electric bass
- Wade Jackson – tenor saxophone

Technical

- Ed Thrasher – art direction
- Ed Caraeff – cover photography
