= The Upsetters (American band) =

American rock band

- Origin: Macon, Georgia, U.S.
- Genres: Rock and roll; R&B; jump blues
- Years active: 1953–early 1960s
- Labels: Specialty, Little Star
- Past members: Little Richard; Grady Gaines; Jimi Hendrix; Wilbert Lee Diamond; Olse "Bassey" Robinson; Nathniel "Buster" Douglas; Clifford Verke; Charles "Chuck" Connor

The Upsetters were an American band that played with American musician and poet Little Richard from 1953 to the early 1960s. They would continue to tour and record through the late 1960s as a backing band with Otis Redding and as a solo group as well. They have been credited by James Brown and others with first putting the funk in the rock and roll beat.

== Background ==
In 1953, Little Richard, dissatisfied with his solo career, formed a road band starting with Wilburt "Lee Diamond" Smith on saxophone, who became the leader, Nathaniel "Buster" Douglas on electric guitar, Charles "Chuck" Connor on drums, and Olsie "Bassy" Robinson on bass guitar. Little Richard and the band did many club performances from 1953 to 1955. Little Richard did not record his first hit "Tutti Frutti" with the Upsetters, but he recorded it with studio musicians who had worked with Fats Domino, after he told Art Rupe, founder of Specialty Records, that he liked Fats Domino's music. He recorded a number of songs with the Upsetters such as "Keep A-Knockin'", "Ooh My Soul"and "Every Night About This Time"; however most of his big hits in his prime were recorded with a studio band which included Lee Allen and Earl Palmer.

== Films ==
The band appeared in a few rock and roll films such as: The Girl Can't Help It, Don't Knock the Rock, and Mister Rock and Roll. They did not actually play, nor did Little Richard sing, but they lip synched to their hits "Tutti Frutti", "Long Tall Sally", "Ready Teddy", "The Girl Can't Help It", and "She's Got It" from 1956 to 1957.

== Little Richard retires from secular music for gospel ==
During a concert in Australia in late 1957, Little Richard decided it was time to quit rock and roll and devote himself to God, after he saw the Russian satellite 'Sputnik 1' fly overhead. He believed it was a sign from God to give up music. Specialty Records released three albums after he quit - Here's Little Richard (1957), Little Richard (1958), and The Fabulous Little Richard (1959). The band continued until the mid-1960s. They had songs including "Hattie Malatti" and "Mama Loochie" (1958), both sung by the band's lead sax player Wilburt Smith under the alias 'Lee Diamond and the Upsetters'.
