= Jenny, Jenny =

Single by Little Richard

from the album Here's Little Richard
- B-side: "Miss Ann"
- Released: 1957
- Recorded: October 15, 1956
- Studio: J&M (New Orleans, Louisiana)
- Genre: Rock and roll, R&B
- Length: 2:04
- Label: Specialty
- Songwriters: Little Richard, Enotris Johnson
- Producer: Robert "Bumps" Blackwell

Little Richard singles chronology
"Lucille/Send Me Some Lovin'" (1957)	"Jenny, Jenny" (1957)	"Keep A-Knockin'" (1957)

"Jenny, Jenny" is a 1957 song written by American musician Little Richard and Enotris Johnson and recorded and released by Little Richard. It was featured on Penniman's debut album, Here's Little Richard and peaked at number ten on the US Billboard Hot 100 and reached number two on the Hot Rhythm and Blues Singles chart. In Canada it reached number eight.

The song featured Penniman and studio musicians for Cosimo Matassa's J&M Recording Studio in New Orleans that had been recording with Penniman since September 1955 including drummer Earl Palmer and saxophonists Lee Allen and Alvin "Red" Tyler.

Penniman re-recorded the song three times in his career, the first version re-recorded for his 1966 Modern album, The Incredible Little Richard Sings His Greatest Hits - Live!, the 1967 live album, Little Richard's Greatest Hits: Recorded Live!, for an album titled Mr. Big, which included re-recorded studio versions of Penniman's classic hits recorded between 1964 and 1965, and his 1976 album, Little Richard Live, with another re-recorded studio version.

== Credits ==
- Little Richard: vocals, piano
- Lee Allen: tenor saxophone
- Alvin "Red" Tyler: baritone saxophone
- Earl Palmer: drums
- Frank Fields: bass
- Edgar Blanchard: guitar
