= Little Richard's Greatest Hits: Recorded Live! =

Little Richard's Greatest Hits - Recorded Live!

Live album by Little Richard
- Released: July 1967
- Recorded: 25 January 1967
- Genre: Rock and roll
- Length: 35:51
- Label: Okeh
- Producer: Larry Williams

Little Richard chronology
The Explosive Little Richard (1967)	Little Richard's Greatest Hits - Recorded Live! (1967)	The Rill Thing (1970)

Professional ratings
Review scores
Source	Rating
Rolling Stone	(favorable)

Little Richard's Greatest Hits - Recorded Live! is the second and last album by Little Richard for the Okeh label. A live album, it was recorded in the CBS Studios at Hollywood.

== History ==
After the recording sessions for this album, (actually the result of Richard’s manager, Bumps Blackwell’s effort to convince European fans to petition Okeh Records to cut a live album), Richard recorded three more tracks for Okeh on May 17, 1967, one issued in 2004 ('Golden Arrow'), leaving the other two unreleased; then recorded six tracks in New York, Los Angeles, and Chicago for the Brunswick Records label late in 1967 and in 1968. The Brunswick tracks were released between December '67 - September '68, none of which were hits. Meanwhile, Little Richard saw out 1967 with an appearance in the film Catalina Caper.

From this point on Richard was out of the recording studios, not returning until March 1970 with the Reprise Records label.

== Track listing ==
1. "Lucille" (Albert Collins, Richard Penniman) - 2:30
2. "The Girl Can't Help It" (Bobby Troup) – 1:34
3. "Tutti Frutti" (Dorothy LaBostrie, Richard Penniman) – 1:29
4. "Send Me Some Lovin'" (John Marascalco, Leo Price) – 2:48
5. "Get Down With It (aka Do The Jerk)" (Bobby Marchan) – 6:24
6. "Long Tall Sally" (Enotris Johnson, Robert Blackwell, Richard Penniman) – 1:43
7. "True Fine Mama" (Richard Penniman) – 3:04
8. "Jenny, Jenny" (Enotris Johnson, Richard Penniman) – 1:55
9. "Good Golly Miss Molly" (John Marascalco, Robert Blackwell) – 2:37
10. "Whole Lotta Shakin' Going On" (Dave Williams, Sunny David) – 3:03
11. "Baby What You Want Me to Do" (listed as "Anyway You Want Me") (Jimmy Reed) – 2:54
12. "Don't Fight It" (listed as "You Gotta Feel It") (Cropper / Pickett) – 4:22
13. “The Scratch” (James Brown instrumental, unlisted)

== Personnel ==
- Little Richard – vocals, piano
- Billy Preston – organ
- Eddie Fletcher – bass
- Glenn Willings – guitar
- Johnny "Guitar" Watson – guitar

Drummer unknown; no records kept by Okeh

== Charts ==
Chart (1967)	Peak position
US Top LPs (Billboard)	184
US Top Soul LPs (Billboard)	28
