= The Second Coming (Little Richard album) =

Studio album by Little Richard
- Released: September 1972
- Recorded: 27 March – 12 April 1972
- Studio: Record Plant (Los Angeles)
- Genre: Rock and roll; soul; funk
- Length: 41:02
- Label: Reprise
- Producer: Richard Penniman, Robert "Bumps" Blackwell

Little Richard chronology
The King of Rock and Roll (1971)	The Second Coming (1972)	Right Now! (1974)

The Second Coming was Little Richard's third album for Reprise Records, released in 1972. The album saw him reunited with Robert "Bumps" Blackwell from his Specialty days, with them co-writing the majority of the album together. The concept was to unite the best rock studio musicians of the '50s with the best rock studio musicians of the '70s. The album failed to chart.

== History ==
Little Richard's profile was high during this period, with works including a track, "Miss Ann", on the album To Bonnie from Delaney, a still unreleased track with Joey Covington of The Jefferson Airplane and Hot Tuna, "Bludgeon of a Bluecoat (The Man)", a duet with Mylon LeFevre on his 1972 release, "He's Not Just a Soldier", a cover of his 1961 Mercury track, and two tracks on the soundtrack to $. He also cut "But I Try" with The James Gang (unreleased until 2013), and "Rockin' With the King", with Canned Heat, in late 1971. However, his own records weren't selling, and a fourth (apparently planned as his third) and final album for Reprise - Southern Child - was dropped from release. The tracks to all of Richard's Reprise sessions, including the Southern Child album, were finally released on CD in 2005 by Rhino Records.

Second Coming was recorded in 1972, at the Record Plant, in Los Angeles, California, and employed top 1950s and 1970s players. Whereas the previous Reprise album, King of Rock and Roll was considered to be under-produced and too commercial, the third released album was considered vastly over-produced, yet featuring little of the star himself. To wit, the 7 minute, one-chord instrumental, "Satisfied, Sanctified, Toe-Tapper", was a standout.

Richard recalled: "I left Reprise because I felt that the producers didn't have me at heart. The Rill Thing was a good album. All the Reprise albums were, but they didn't push them. So I left them. It wasn't mutual. I went to Reprise because I felt the company could do something. [...] I think the producers and people who worked there thought I wasn't their main singer." (page 167).

== Track listing ==
All tracks composed by Richard Penniman; except where indicated

1. "Mockingbird Sally" – 3:41
2. "Second Line" (Penniman, Robert "Bumps" Blackwell) – 4:50
3. "It Ain't What You Do, It's the Way How You Do It" (Penniman, Pete Kleinman) – 2:45
4. "The Saints" – 5:03
5. "Nuki Suki" (Bill Hemmons) – 5:32
6. "Rockin' Rockin' Boogie" (Penniman, Seabrun Hunter) – 5:28
7. "Prophet of Peace" – 3:19
8. "Thomasine" (Penniman, Maybelle Jackson) – 3:11
9. "Sanctified, Satisfied Toe-Tapper" – 7:12

== Personnel ==
- Little Richard – vocals, piano, electric piano, Clavichord
- Chuck Rainey – bass
- Sneaky Pete Kleinow – pedal steel guitar
- Mike Deasy, George Davis, Adolph Jacobs, David T. Walker – guitar
- Earl Palmer – drums
- Lee Allen, Bill Hemmons – tenor saxophone
- Jim Horn – baritone saxophone

Technical

- Ed Thrasher – art direction
- David Willardson – cover artwork
- Ed Caraeff – photography

== Charts ==
Album

Year	Chart	Position
1972	Billboard Pop Albums	Did not chart

Single

	Year	Chart	Position
Mockingbird Sally/Nuki Suki	1972	Billboard Pop Albums	Did not chart
