= Slippin' and Slidin' =

"Slippin' and Slidin' (Peepin' and Hidin')"
- 1965 Dutch re-release

Single by Little Richard
- A-side: "Long Tall Sally"
- Released: March 1956
- Recorded: February 1956
- Genre: Rock and roll
- Length: 2:00
- Label: Specialty (SP-572-45)
- Songwriters: Richard Penniman a.k.a. Little Richard; Edwin Bocage a.k.a. Eddie Bo; Al Collins; James Smith
- Producer: Robert Blackwell

Little Richard singles chronology
"Tutti Frutti" (1955)	"Slippin' and Slidin' (Peepin' and Hidin')" (1956)	"Rip It Up" b/w "Reddy Teddy" (1956)

"Slippin' and Slidin' (Peepin' and Hidin')" is an R&B/rock 'n' roll song performed by Little Richard. The song is credited to Little Richard, Edwin Bocage (Eddie Bo), Al Collins, and James Smith.

Al Collins first recorded "I Got the Blues for You" in 1955. Eddie Bo wrote new lyrics and adapted the song in 1956 under the name "I'm Wise". Bo's recording was released by the Apollo label. Little Richard recorded it the same year, and changed the title to "Slippin' and Slidin'". His version is on his first album, Here's Little Richard. He recorded several versions for Specialty until the February 1956 version was chosen as the B-side to "Long Tall Sally". Richard re-recorded the song for Vee Jay in 1964 and Modern in 1965 (live). Another version appeared on a Modern single, #1030, believed to be a studio leftover from Vee Jay.

"Slippin' and Slidin'" was the title of a song written by Maxwell Davis and performed by Calvin Boze and His All Stars, and released in May 1951 by Aladdin Records (3086). The song was described as "an engaging set of novelty lyrics, while combo puts down a swingy, medium shuffle". Over a year earlier, this song had been recorded by Gene Phillips – Jack McVea, and released on Modern (20–733). It was a fast blues with Phillips delivering in a Louis Jordan-like style. A version by J. Lewis and Trio was released on Atlantic (927) in early 1951.

John Lennon recorded a rendition of the song which was included in his 1975 cover album Rock 'n' Roll.

== Personnel ==
- Little Richard – vocals, piano
- Lee Allen – tenor sax
- Alvin "Red" Tyler – baritone sax
- Frank Fields – bass
- Earl Palmer – drums
- Edgar Blanchard – guitar
