= The Fabulous Little Richard =

Studio album by Little Richard
- Released: 1958 (UK & Canada); March 1959 (U.S.)
- Recorded: September 13, 1955–October 18, 1957
- Genre: Rock and roll
- Length: 30:37
- Label: Specialty
- Producer: Bumps Blackwell

Little Richard chronology
Little Richard (1958)	The Fabulous Little Richard (1958)	Pray Along with Little Richard (1960)

Professional ratings
Review scores
Source	Rating
AllMusic	3/5 stars
The Encyclopedia of Popular Music	5/5 stars
The Rolling Stone Album Guide	3/5 stars

The Fabulous Little Richard is the third studio album by the American musician Little Richard, and the final album to be released during his rock and roll period. Released seventeen months after he had left the Specialty Records label, Richard had returned to religion and turned his back on the music that made him famous. Though he would briefly rescind that decision in 1962, and sporadically throughout his career, this album marked the end of his peak period. In order to make the record more accessible to listeners, over half of the tracks featured an overdubbed female backing group. The record was put together including out-takes and other leftover studio tracks, which saw Richard in a somewhat more mellow styling.

It was voted number 483 in the third edition of Colin Larkin's All Time Top 1000 Albums (2000).

== History ==
Richard had received a vision of a plane on fire, and took it as a sign from God to leave showbusiness. He recalled that in 1957: "There were ten days of the tour left to run, but I would not work any more. Our tickets home were bought on the basis of a two-week tour, but I demanded passage back to the States for the total entourage ten days early. The incredible thing is that the plane we were originally scheduled to return on crashed into the Pacific Ocean. That's when I felt that God really had inspired me to do the things I did at the time."

The liner notes of the album observed that Little Richard "is at present deeply engrossed in religious activities, thus sacrificing the millions of dollars he could be earning through personal appearances on television, in motion pictures, and in concerts." The sleeve notes also claimed that the overdubbed tracks were Little Richard's decision, stating that "Little Richard has added voices on several of these numbers, bringing him closer to the type of church singing he was brought up on, and to which he is now returning."

The track "Kansas City" would also feature lyrics from his own "Hey, Hey, Hey, Hey", something which The Beatles had to credit on album pressings after covering it for Beatles for Sale and not realising the addition. This hit version by Richard was originally credited only to Leiber and Stoller, although the lyrics are completely different.

Six months after the release of this album, Richard would begin to record gospel music, a genre he continued in — barring a brief dalliance with the Little Star Records label in 1962 — for the next four years. In April 1963 he entered Sam Cooke's studio to begin recording new tracks for Specialty. The official return to Specialty came in March 1964, and included a Cooke song tried out in 1963.

== Track listing ==
All tracks are written by Richard Penniman, except where noted.

Side One
No.	Title	Writer(s)	Length
1.	"Shake a Hand" (*)	Joe Morris	2:51
2.	"Chicken Little Baby" (*)		2:01
3.	"All Night Long"		2:15
4.	"The Most I Can Offer (Just My Heart)" (*)		2:22
5.	"Lonesome and Blue"		2:17
6.	"Wonderin'" (*)		2:50
7.	"She Knows How to Rock"	Willie Perryman	2:02

Side Two
No.	Title	Writer(s)	Length
1.	"Kansas City" (*)	Jerry Leiber, Mike Stoller	2:41
2.	"Directly from My Heart" (*)		2:20
3.	"Maybe I'm Right" (*)		2:10
4.	"Early One Morning"		2:15
5.	"I'm Just a Lonely Guy" (*)	Dorothy LaBostrie	2:38
6.	"Whole Lotta Shakin' Goin' On"	Dave Williams, Sunny David	1:52
Total length:			30:37

(*) indicates a track overdubbed by The Stewart Sisters.

== Personnel ==
- Little Richard – vocals, piano
- Lee Allen – tenor saxophone
- Alvin "Red" Tyler – baritone saxophone
- Frank Fields – bass
- Earl Palmer – drums
- Edgar Blanchard – guitar
- Charles Connor – drums
- The Stewart Sisters – overdubbed vocals
