= The Wild and Frantic Little Richard =

Compilation album by Little Richard
- Released: 1966 or 1967
- Recorded: August 1964 – December 1965 – January 1966
- Genre: Rock and roll
- Label: Modern

Little Richard chronology
The Incredible Little Richard Sings His Greatest Hits – Live! (1966)	The Wild and Frantic Little Richard (1966)	The Explosive Little Richard (1967)

The Wild and Frantic Little Richard is the second and last Little Richard album released on the Modern Records label. It is composed of songs released on singles during his time with the label, live tracks, and material licensed or left over from Vee-Jay. (Little Richard produced Vee-Jay 1107). Some tracks released on 45 were different versions, shorter or longer, with or without horns and overdubs. Live material appears to be from 1 December 1965, at the Domino Club, Atlanta, Georgia. Studio from 31 August 1964, Los Angeles; 1 January 1966, Memphis.

== Track listing ==
1. "Baby What You Want Me to Do" (live) (Grant Higgins)
2. "Do the Jerk" [aka "Get Down With It"] (live?)
3. "Directly From My Heart" (Penniman)
4. "I'm Back" (Penniman)
5. "Holy Mackerel" (Mitchell, Penniman)
6. "Good Golly, Miss Molly" (live) (John Marascalco, Robert Blackwell)
7. "Send Me Some Lovin'" (live) (Charles Price, John Marascalco)
8. "Groovy Little Suzy" [extended version of the Vee-Jay track] (John Marascalco)
9. "Baby Don't You Want a Man Like Me" (Penniman)
10. "Miss Ann" (live) (Enotris Johnson, Penniman)

== Personnel ==
- Little Richard – vocals, piano

Additional personnel listed in Modern archives as Stax session musicians, except for "Baby What Do You Want Me to Do", which is listed as Little Richard's backing band, The Upsetters, and an unidentified female vocalist. Little Richard has said that Jimi Hendrix played on some sessions and songs.
