= Send Me Some Lovin' =

- 1963 Japanese re-release

Single by Little Richard

from the album Little Richard
- A-side: "Lucille"
- Released: February 1957
- Recorded: October 16, 1956
- Studio: J&M Music, New Orleans, Louisiana
- Genre: Rock and roll
- Length: 2:21
- Label: Specialty
- Songwriter(s): John Marascalco, Leo Price
- Producer(s): Robert "Bumps" Blackwell

Little Richard singles chronology
"The Girl Can't Help It" (1956)	"Send Me Some Lovin'" (1957)	"Jenny, Jenny" (1957)

"Send Me Some Lovin'" is a 1957 rock and roll standard written by John Marascalco and Leo Price, famously recorded by Little Richard.

== Background ==
Little Richard recorded the song October 16, 1956, at J&M Music Shop in New Orleans, Louisiana, recording "The Girl Can't Help It" and "Baby Face" at the same session. Richard's backing band on the session consisted of Lee Allen (tenor saxophone), Alvin "Red" Tyler (baritone saxophone), Edgar Blanchard (guitar), Frank Fields (bass), and Earl Palmer (drums). Specialty Records owner Art Rupe produced the recording.

Specialty released Little Richard's track as a single in February 1957. The song also appeared on his second album in 1958. The song was also recorded by The Crickets for their 1957 debut album, The "Chirping" Crickets, and by various other artists including Sam Cooke, Brenda Lee, Dean Martin, James Booker, Stevie Wonder, Hank Williams Jr., Otis Redding, Gene Vincent, and John Lennon.
