= Little Richard Is Back (And There's a Whole Lotta Shakin' Goin' On!) =

Studio album by Little Richard
- Released: August 1964
- Genre: Rock and roll
- Length: 39:22
- Label: Vee-Jay

Little Richard chronology
The King of the Gospel Singers (1962)	Little Richard Is Back (And There's a Whole Lotta Shakin' Goin' On!) (1964)	Little Richard's Greatest Hits (1965)

Little Richard Is Back (And There's a Whole Lotta Shakin' Goin' On!) is Little Richard's first album of rock and roll songs for Vee-Jay Records. The label went out of business and its records were not accurate, leaving many to speculate about the recording details. Despite claims to the contrary, Jimi Hendrix does not play on any of the album's songs.

== Background ==
After leaving Specialty Records in 1957 to record gospel music, Richard recorded twenty tracks for Goldner Records in the summer of 1959, in New York City, on his break from Bible College, in Huntsville, Alabama. Although tempted back to record rock and roll with his old band the Upsetters for Little Star Records in 1962, he soon went back to gospel, recording for Atlantic Records in 1963. A successful British tour finally made Richard return to his rock and roll roots, and tracks for singles were cut in 1964 with Specialty, though not enough for an album.

== Track listing ==
1. "A Whole Lotta Shakin' Goin' On" (Dave Williams, Sunny David)
2. "Going Home Tomorrow" (Alvin E. Young, Fats Domino)
3. "Money Honey" (Jesse Stone)
4. "Only You" (Buck Ram)
5. "Hound Dog" (Jerry Leiber, Mike Stoller)
6. "Goodnight Irene" (Huddie Ledbetter, John Lomax)
7. "Lawdy Miss Claudie" (Lloyd Price)
8. "Groovy Little Suzy" (Harry Nilsson, John Marascalco)
9. "Short Fat Fanny" (Larry Williams)
10. "Cherry Red" (Pete Johnson, Joe Turner)
11. "Memories Are Made of This" (Frank Miller, Richard Dehr, Terry Gilkyson)
12. "Blueberry Hill" (Al Lewis, Larry Stock, Vincent Rose)
