= Lucille (Little Richard song) =

1957 song by Little Richard

Single by Little Richard

from the album Little Richard
- B-side: "Send Me Some Lovin'"
- Released: February 1957
- Recorded: July 30, 1956
- Studio: J&M (New Orleans)
- Genre: Rock and roll
- Length: 2:21
- Label: Specialty
- Songwriters: Albert Collins; Richard Penniman
- Producer: Robert "Bumps" Blackwell

Little Richard singles chronology
"The Girl Can't Help It" (1956)	"Lucille" (1957)	"Jenny, Jenny" (1957)

"Lucille" is a 1957 rock and roll song originally recorded by American musician Little Richard. Released on Specialty Records in February 1957, it reached No. 1 on the Billboard R&B chart, 21 on the US pop chart, and 4 on the UK singles chart.

== Composition and recording ==
The song was composed by Little Richard and songwriter Albert Collins (not to be confused with the guitarist of the same name). First pressings of Specialty 78 rpm credit Collins as the sole writer, with Little Richard buying half of the song's rights while Collins was imprisoned at the Louisiana State Penitentiary. Little Richard sang and played piano on his recording, produced by Robert "Bumps" Blackwell, and was backed by a band consisting of Lee Allen (tenor saxophone), Alvin "Red" Tyler (baritone sax), Roy Montrell (guitar), Frank Fields (bass), and Earl Palmer (drums).

The song foreshadowed the rhythmic feel of 1960s rock music in several ways, including its heavy bassline and slower tempo, inspired by the chugging of a train Little Richard and his band had been riding. The song also features stop-time breaks and no change in harmony, with a darker sound due to most of the instruments using a low register.

Like many of his other hits, Little Richard re-recorded "Lucille" multiple times throughout his career. The first substantially different version of the song was recorded in 1964 and appeared on Little Richard's Greatest Hits. His last recording appears on the 1992 album Little Richard Meets Masayoshi Takanaka. In 1994, he appeared on Sesame Street to perform "Rosita", a rewritten version of "Lucille" about the Muppet character Rosita.

== Release and legacy ==
Released on Specialty Records in February 1957, the song reached No. 1 on the Billboard R&B chart, 21 on the US pop chart, and 10 on the UK singles chart.

In 2002, "Lucille" was inducted into the Grammy Hall of Fame. Music critic and writer Dave Marsh included the song on his list of The 1001 Greatest Singles Ever Made at number 670.

== Cover versions ==
"Lucille (You Won't Do Your Daddy's Will)"

Single by Waylon Jennings

from the album It's Only Rock+Roll
- B-side: "Medley Of Hits"
- Released: February 1983
- Recorded: January 17, 1983
- Genre: Country
- Length: 3:25
- Label: RCA
- Songwriters: Albert Collins; Richard Penniman
- Producer: Waylon Jennings; Randy Scruggs

Waylon Jennings singles chronology
"(Sittin' On) The Dock of the Bay (with Willie Nelson)" (1982)	"Lucille (You Won't Do Your Daddy's Will)" (1983)	"Breakin' Down" (1983)

- The Everly Brothers recorded a cover in 1960, which peaked at No. 21 on the Hot 100.
- The song was covered in Serbo-Croatian in 1962 by Yugoslav singer Saša Popaz under the title "Lučija", released on a 7-inch single. A year later, another Yugoslav singer, Perica Stojančić recorded his version, entitled "Lucia", releasing it as a title track of his debut EP.
- The Hollies recorded a cover in 1963.
- The Beatles covered "Lucille" for the BBC's Pop Go the Beatles #14 on September 3, 1963, which aired two weeks later. They had also recorded a second rendition on September 7 for Saturday Club's 5th Birthday Edition, which aired on October 5; after the band's break-up, John Lennon and Paul McCartney recorded it on a bootleg called A Toot and a Snore in '74. At the closing day of the Concerts for the People of Kampuchea on December 29, 1979, the supergroup Rockestra performed the song with McCartney. In 1987, McCartney rerecorded it for his album CHOBA B CCCP, which was released in Russia in 1988 and the rest of the world in 1991.
- Ralph Williams/The Marauders covered the song in 1964.
- The Doors performed "Lucille" as the closing track of their London Fog 1966 performance, which was released as a recording in 2016 and is believed to be their first recorded live performance.
- Deep Purple frequently performed "Lucille" as an encore during the 1970s and 1980s. One performance is included as a bonus track on the 1998 reissue of their album Made in Japan. In 1984, during their tour in Australia, former Beatles member George Harrison joined Deep Purple on stage to perform the song.
- Brian Protheroe included a cover of the song on his 1976 album I/You.
- In 1977, Queen performed the song on two nights in Earl's Court.
- In 1983, Waylon Jennings recorded a cover of "Lucille" and released it as a single, which became his 12th No. 1 on the country chart. In Canada, it reached number 4.
- In 1986, Juan Pardo recorded a Spanish version of "Lucille" titled "El hombre del Norte" ("The Northman").

== In popular culture ==
- The song can be heard on the radio station Delta Radio when driving in the 2010 video game Mafia II.
