= Little Richard (album) =

Studio album by Little Richard
- Released: July 1958
- Recorded: November 29, 1955 – October 18, 1957
- Genres: Rock and roll; rhythm and blues
- Length: 26:48
- Label: Specialty
- Producer: Bumps Blackwell

Little Richard chronology
Here's Little Richard (1957)	Little Richard (1958)	The Fabulous Little Richard (1958)

Singles from Little Richard
- 1. "Heeby-Jeebies" Released: Oct. 1956; 2. "The Girl Can't Help It/All Around the World" Released: Dec. 1956; 3. "Lucille/Send Me Some Lovin'" Released: Feb. 1957; 4. "Keep A-Knockin'" Released: Aug. 1957; 5. "Good Golly, Miss Molly" Released: Jan. 1958; 6. "Ooh! My Soul" Released: May 1958; 7. "Baby Face" Released: July 1958; 8. "By the Light of the Silvery Moon" Released: March 1959

Little Richard (titled Volume 2 in the UK) is the second studio album by the American musician Little Richard, released by July 1958, ten months after Richard announced a retirement from rock and roll to pursue a life in the ministry. Like his first album, it largely contains previously released A-sides and B-sides including several which reached Billboard's Rhythm & Blues and Hot 100 charts. Nine of its twelve tracks charted in the US including Richard's fourth million-seller "Lucille", the rock and roll standard "Good Golly, Miss Molly" and "The Girl Can't Help It", the title song from the motion picture of the same name. Among the previously unreleased tracks are two Tin Pan Alley songs recorded in Richard's frantic style.

== Critical reviews ==
Professional ratings
Review scores
Source	Rating
AllMusic	4.5/5 stars
The Encyclopedia of Popular Music	5/5 stars
The Rolling Stone Album Guide	3/5 stars
Sputnikmusic	4.0/5 stars

Reviewing Little Richard upon its release, Billboard praised the album as "a worthy successor to Here's Little Richard", commenting "the cat is at his frantic best". Cash Box described the album as "in typical explosive Richard style".

In a retrospective review, AllMusic's Mark Deming considered Little Richard "every bit as rockin' as his first album, if not more so... there isn't a single throwaway among the 12 tunes on deck".

== Track listing ==
All tracks are written by Richard Penniman, except where noted.

Side One
No.	Title	Writer(s)	Length
1.	"Keep A-Knockin'"		2:19
2.	"By the Light of the Silvery Moon"	Gus Edwards, Edward Madden	2:09
3.	"Send Me Some Lovin'"	John Marascalco, Leo Price	2:21
4.	"I'll Never Let You Go (Boo Hoo Hoo Hoo)"		2:23
5.	"Heeby Jeebies"	Maybelle Jackson, Marascalco	2:16
6.	"All Around the World"	Robert Blackwell, McKinley Millet	1:54

Side Two
No.	Title	Writer(s)	Length
1.	"Good Golly, Miss Molly"	Blackwell, Marascalco	2:12
2.	"Baby Face"	Harry Akst, Benny Davis	2:14
3.	"Hey-Hey-Hey-Hey"		2:08
4.	"Ooh! My Soul"		1:55
5.	"The Girl Can't Help It"	Bobby Troup	2:33
6.	"Lucille"	Albert Collins, Penniman	2:24
Total length:			26:48

== Charts ==
=== Weekly ===
Year	Chart	Position
1958	Billboard Pop Albums	76

=== Singles ===
Year	Single	Chart	Position
1956	"Heeby-Jeebies"	Billboard Black Singles	7
1956	"The Girl Can't Help It"	Billboard Black Singles	7
1956	"The Girl Can't Help It"	Billboard Pop Singles	49
1956	"All Around the World"	Billboard Black Singles	13
1957	"Lucille"	Billboard Black Singles	1
1957	"Lucille"	Billboard Pop Singles	21
1957	"Send Me Some Lovin'"	Billboard Black Singles	3
1957	"Send Me Some Lovin'"	Billboard Pop Singles	54
1957	"Keep A-Knockin'"	Billboard Black Singles	2
1957	"Keep A-Knockin'"	Billboard Pop Singles	8
1958	"Good Golly, Miss Molly"	Billboard Black Singles	4
1958	"Good Golly, Miss Molly"	Billboard Pop Singles	10
1958	"Ooh! My Soul"	Billboard Black Singles	15
1958	"Ooh! My Soul"	Billboard Pop Singles	35
1958	"Baby Face"	Billboard Black Singles	21
1958	"Baby Face"	Billboard Pop Singles	41
