= Right Now! (Little Richard album) =

Studio album by Little Richard
- Released: 1974
- Recorded: January 1973
- Studio: Muscle Shoals (Alabama)
- Genre: Soul
- Length: 36:39
- Label: United
- Producer: Robert "Bumps" Blackwell

Little Richard chronology
Friends from the Beginning - Little Richard and Jimi Hendrix (1972)	Right Now! (1974)	Talkin' 'bout Soul (1974)

Right Now! is a studio album by Little Richard, released in 1974. It was released without much publicity on the United Records label. The album features "Chain Chain Chain", more commonly known under the title "Chain of Fools".

== History ==
Right Now! was recorded in January 1973, possibly in Muscle Shoals Sound Studio, Alabama, and issued with no publicity as a low-budget LP. Richard himself recalled that: "We were about to start a tour and we needed some money. So Robert "Bumps" Blackwell and me got a deal for one album with an advance of ten thousand dollars from Kent Modern. We went into the studio and did it in one night. I did material we had worked out together. I prefer recording at night, my voice is in better shape then."

== Track listing ==
1. "In the Name" – 3:08
2. "Mississippi" – 2:41
3. "Don't You Know I" – 3:03
4. "Chain Chain Chain" – 4:14
5. "Gerald Jones" – 6:33
6. "Dock of the Bay" – 2:51
7. "Chains of Love" – 8:15
8. "Hot Nuts" – 6:16

== Personnel ==
- Little Richard – vocals, piano
- unknown – drums, bass, rhythm and lead guitar, organ, saxophones

No records were kept of the rest of the personnel.
