= Ready Teddy =

Original song written and composed by Robert Blackwell, John Marascalco

- Dutch release picture sleeve

Single by Little Richard

from the album Here's Little Richard
- A-side: "Rip It Up"
- Released: June 1956
- Recorded: May 9, 1956
- Studio: J&M, New Orleans, Louisiana
- Genre: Rock and roll
- Length: 2:07
- Label: Specialty
- Songwriter(s): John Marascalco, Robert Blackwell
- Producer(s): Robert Blackwell

Little Richard singles chronology
"Long Tall Sally" b/w "Slippin' and Slidin'" (1956)	"Ready Teddy" (1956)	"She's Got It" b/w "Heeby-Jeebies" (1956)

"Ready Teddy" is a song written by John Marascalco and Robert Blackwell, and first made popular by Little Richard in 1956. Little Richard sang and played piano on the recording, backed by a band consisting of Lee Allen (tenor saxophone), Alvin "Red" Tyler (baritone sax), Edgar Blanchard (guitar), Frank Fields (bass), and Earl Palmer (drums).

It has since been covered by Buddy Holly, The Tornados, Elvis Presley, Cliff Richard And The Shadows, Tony Sheridan and others, making it something of a rock and roll standard. The composition, an uptempo rock and roll song, received its largest ever recognition on the evening of September 9, 1956, as Presley sang it in front of some 60 million television viewers during his first appearance on The Ed Sullivan Show on CBS, a broadcast which received a Trendex percentage share of 82.6, the largest ever obtained in the history of U.S. television. It was later used in Federico Fellini's La Dolce Vita (1960) as a version by Italian rocker Adriano Celentano.
