= Friends from the Beginning – Little Richard and Jimi Hendrix =

Unofficial Little Richard album

Studio album (unofficial) by Little Richard
- Released: 1972
- Recorded: various dates 1964–1971
- Genre: Rock and roll
- Length: 34:55

Friends from the Beginning – Little Richard and Jimi Hendrix is an album attributed to Little Richard and Jimi Hendrix, purportedly recorded sometime between 1964 and its 1972 release date. Contrary to the album title and claims in the liner notes, Hendrix does not contribute anything to the recording. Little Richard's involvement in some of the songs has also been questioned. Over the years, similar albums have been released in various formats by small record labels in many countries (see Discogs link at bottom of page).

AllMusic critic Joe Vilione describes the album as "totally bogus" and adds:

Fraudulent recordings like Friends from the Beginning serve no purpose but to confuse the public and harm the reputations of the artists whose names appear on these travesties. It is a deception.

Hendrix was an occasional member of Richard's backup band, the Upsetters, between late 1964 or January 1965, through June or July 1965. Hendrix biographers have identified only two songs he recorded with Richard, but are uncertain about the recording dates: "I Don't Know What You've Got (But It's Got Me)", a two-part single released by Vee-Jay Records in November 1965, and "Dancing All Around the World". Neither song appears on this album, although they are included on the West Coast Seattle Boy: The Jimi Hendrix Anthology (2010).

In July 1965, Hendrix played guitar during a WLAC-TV television appearance by Buddy & Stacy, two vocalists with the Upsetters. They performed the Junior Walker hit "Shotgun", which was broadcast on Night Train, a Nashville, Tennessee, music variety show. Soon thereafter, Hendrix moved to New York City, where he sent a postcard to his father:

He [Little Richard] didn't pay us for five and a half weeks, and you can't live on promises when you're on the road, so I had to cut that mess loose.

Richard's brother, Robert Penniman, later claimed that Hendrix was fired because "he was always late for the bus and flirting with all the girls and stuff like that."
