= She's Got It =

- 1964 Dutch re-release

Single by Little Richard

from the album Here's Little Richard
- A-side: "Heeby-Jeebies"
- Released: Oct 1956
- Genre: Rock and roll
- Label: Specialty
- Songwriter(s): John Marascalco, Richard Penniman
- Producer(s): Robert Blackwell

Little Richard singles chronology
"Rip It Up" b/w "Reddy Teddy" (1956)	"She's Got It" (1956)	"The Girl Can't Help It" b/w "All Around The World"" (1956)

"She's Got It" is a 1956 song by Little Richard, written by John Marascalco and Little Richard. It was originally called "I Got It" (and Richard had also recorded a version with that title), but the lyrics were rewritten for the film The Girl Can't Help It. The song was first issued as single in October, reaching No. 9 on Billboard's R&B chart, and was then included on Richard's debut album on Specialty Records Here's Little Richard. The number was sung on film by Little Richard while Jayne Mansfield's character went to the powder room in The Girl Can't Help It.
