= Travis Wammack =

American musician (1944–2026)

- Born: Travis Lavoid Wammack Sr. November 19,1944; Walnut, Mississippi, U.S.
- Died: February 27, 2026 (aged 81) Alabama, U.S.
- Genre: Rock and roll
- Occupations: Guitarist; singer; songwriter
- Years active: 1957–2026
- Labels: ARA, Fame, Atlantic, Congress, Capricorn, Epic
- Website: traviswammack.com

Travis Lavoid Wammack Sr. (November 19, 1944 – February 27, 2026) was an American rock and roll guitarist from Memphis, Tennessee.

Described as an "instrumental genius" and "a precursor to guitar-hero shredding", he is known for his "magnificent guitar pyrotechnics", "hot and speedy guitar chops", and "wild guitar workouts" featuring early use of fuzztone and distortion. Taught by Ruby Ester Jones of Walnut, MS and Memphis, TN a child prodigy, Wammack's first recording was made when he was 12 years old, and released in 1957 on Fernwood, and at the age of 19 he hit the American chart with "Scratchy", an instrumental which peaked at No. 80 in 1964 (it was actually released in the summer of 1962). He also charted briefly in 1966 at No. 128 with an instrumental version of "Louie Louie".

== Life and career ==
Wammack was born in Walnut, Mississippi, on November 19, 1944.

He worked as a session guitarist at Sonic Recording Service and Hi Records in Memphis and at FAME Studios in Muscle Shoals, Alabama, in the 1960s. He released his first album, Travis Wammack, in 1972 and appeared on the charts with "Whatever Turns You On" (No. 95; written by George Jackson and Raymond Moore) and "How Can I Tell You" (No. 68; written by Cat Stevens). In 1975, he released his second album, Not For Sale, which generated two additional hits: "Easy Evil" (No. 72; written by Alan O'Day), and "(Shu-Doo-Pa-Poo-Poop) Love Being Your Fool" (No. 38; written by Jerry Williams, Jr. and Charlie Whitehead).

He was Little Richard's band leader from 1984 until 1995. He wrote "Greenwood, Mississippi" which Richard recorded in 1970, featuring Wammack on lead guitar. In 1988, Richard recorded Wammack's "(There's) No Place Like Home", planned as a new single, but shelved. Live versions were included on Giants of Rock and Roll, an Australian DVD of a 1989 concert, and on compilations Live in Europe 1993 and The Quasar of Rock.

Still performing, Travis worked with Muscle Shoals Music Marketing and added record producer to his resume. In 1999, Wammack received the Professional Musician Award from the Alabama Music Hall of Fame, and in 2005 was inducted into The Southern Legends Entertainment & Performing Arts Hall of Fame. In May 2006, Gibson Guitars presented Travis with a new Gibson ES-335 guitar as part of their documentary honoring legendary Gibson ES series players. In 2011, he was recognized by the Rockabilly Hall of Fame as a rockabilly "legend".

Wammack performed with Billy Lee Riley and with Sonny Burgess and the Legendary Pacers at Newport, Arkansas's annual Depot Days Festival on September 27, 2008. On August 30, 2009, at the Silver Moon in Newport, Arkansas, he again played with Sonny Burgess and the Legendary Pacers, and with other bands, at the Billy Lee Riley benefit concert. Wammack continued to perform live at the Depot Days Festival and other venues.

Wammack died in Alabama on February 27, 2026, at the age of 81.

== Discography ==
=== Albums ===
- Travis Wammack (Fame Records, 1972)
- Not For Sale (Capricorn, 1975)
- A Man...and a Guitar (Phonorama, 1982)
- Follow Me (Phonorama, 1982)
- Still Rockin (Snakeman Records, 1998)
- Snake, Rattle & Roll in Muscle Shoals (Snakeman Records, 2000)
- Rock-N-Roll Party (Travis Wammack, 2002)
- Scratchy (Travis Wammack, 2006)
- The Psychedelic Years - Live (Travis Wammack, 2006)
- Memphis + Muscle Shoals = Travis Wammack (Travis Wammack, 2007)
- Almost Home (Travis Wammack, 2008)
- Country In My Soul (Muscle Shoals Records, 2009)
- Shotgun Woman (Monaco Records, 2010)
- Rock-N-Roll Days (Travis Wammack, 2010)
- Rock-N-Roll Days Vol. II (Travis Wammack, 2011)
- Blues, Soul & Rock-N-Roll (Travis Wammack, 20??)

=== Compilations ===
- That Scratchy Guitar from Memphis (Bear Family Records, 1987)
- Scr-Scr-Scratchy! (Zu Zazz Records, 2000)
