= The Girl Can't Help It =

1956 musical comedy film by Frank Tashlin

- Theatrical release poster
- Directed by: Frank Tashlin
- Written by: Frank Tashlin; Herbert Baker
- Produced by: Frank Tashlin
- Starring: Tom Ewell; Jayne Mansfield; Edmond O'Brien; Henry Jones; Julie London
- Cinematography: Leon Shamroy
- Edited by: James B. Clark
- Music by: Bobby Troup
- Distributed by: 20th Century-Fox
- Release date: December 19, 1956 (United States)
- Running time: 99 minutes
- Country: United States
- Language: English
- Budget: $1.3 million
- Box office: $6.2 million

The Girl Can't Help It is a 1956 American musical comedy film starring Jayne Mansfield in the lead role, Tom Ewell, Edmond O'Brien, Henry Jones, and Julie London. The picture was produced and directed by Frank Tashlin, with a screenplay adapted by Tashlin and Herbert Baker from an uncredited 1955 short story by Garson Kanin, "Do Re Mi". Filmed in DeLuxe Color, the production was originally intended as a vehicle for the American sex symbol Jayne Mansfield, with a satirical subplot involving teenagers and rock 'n' roll music. The unintended result has been called the "most potent" celebration of rock music ever captured on film.

The original music score, including the title song performed by Little Richard, was by Bobby Troup, with an additional credit to Ray Anthony for the tune "Big Band Boogie".

== Plot ==
A slot machine mobster, Marty "Fats" Murdock, wants his blonde girlfriend, Jerri Jordan, to be a singing star, despite her seeming lack of talent. He hires alcoholic press agent Tom Miller to promote Jordan, both because of his past success with the career of singer Julie London and because he never makes sexual advances towards his female clients.

Miller sets to work by showing Jordan off around numerous night spots; his machinations arouse interest in Jordan and soon offers of contracts follow.

Miller whenever he hears Julie London he would imagine her there. Circumstances change and he starts imagining that Jerri is there instead of Julie.

Miller tells Murdock that all Jordan really just wants to be a homemaker and tries to persuade Murdock not to push Jordan into a show-business career. When he tells Murdock that Jordan's singing is so bad it shatters light bulbs, Murdock insists on having Jordan record a song he composed while in prison, "Rock Around the Rock Pile" (a parody of "Rock Around the Clock"). Miller reluctantly records Jordan performing the part of a prison siren in Murdock's song and heads to Chicago to promote it to Wheeler, a former mob rival of Murdock who now has a monopoly over the jukebox industry.

Suspicious of Miller's reluctance to promote Jordan and of the obvious attraction between Miller and Jordan, Murdock has his associate Mousie wiretap a phone call between the pair. Feeling pity for them, Mousie edits out the romantic portions of their conversations and convinces Murdock that their relationship is strictly business.

In Chicago, Wheeler is impressed by the song and Jordan's voice and offers to sign both Jordan and the songwriter. However, when Miller reveals that the songwriter is Murdock, Wheeler refuses to promote the song. A furious Murdock bullies bar owners into buying jukeboxes from him instead and successfully promotes his and Jordan's song. To prevent Murdock from stealing his business, Wheeler arranges to have Murdock assassinated at the rock show where Jordan will be making her debut.

On his way to the show, Murdock confesses to Mousie that he does not want to marry Jordan. Mousie confesses that he altered the tape of Jordan and Miller's phone call and encourages Murdock to let Jordan marry Miller. Backstage at the show, Jordan confesses her love to Miller and they kiss. Jordan also admits that she is a talented singer, who lied because she did not want a show business career; she goes on stage and performs a song about her love for Miller. When Murdock arrives, Miller tells him that he and Jordan are in love; a delighted Murdock surprises Miller by giving him his blessing.

Before Miller and Murdock can tell Jordan the good news, Wheeler's assassins shoot at Murdock. Miller fights them off and shoves Murdock on stage to perform his song, reasoning that the assassins will not shoot Murdock in front of so many witnesses. Wheeler arrives and, impressed by the audience's response to Murdock, calls off the assassination and signs Murdock instead. The film ends with Miller and Jordan kissing on their honeymoon, as Murdock and Mousie perform on a TV show in the background. In the epilogue, Miller and Jordan are revealed to have five children, whom Murdock often babysits.

== Cast ==
- Tom Ewell as Tom Miller
- Jayne Mansfield as Jerri Jordan
- Edmond O'Brien as Marty "Fats" Murdock
- Julie London as herself
- Ray Anthony as himself
- Barry Gordon as Barry the paperboy
- Henry Jones as Mousie
- John Emery as Wheeler
- Juanita Moore as Hilda
- Fats Domino as himself
- Little Richard as himself
- Eddie Cochran as himself
- The Platters as themselves
- Gene Vincent as himself
- The Treniers as themselves
- Eddie Fontaine as himself
- The Chuckles as themselves
- Abbey Lincoln as herself
- Johnny Olenn as himself
- Nino Tempo as himself

== Production ==
"Do Re Mi", a short story by Garson Kanin that had appeared in The Atlantic magazine in March 1955, was acquired by Fox. They initially assigned producer Nunnally Johnson to develop the film, but then decided to emphasize rock 'n' roll in it and, in 1956, reassigned it to director Frank Tashlin, whose background included work with music in animation. Tashlin collaborated on a new script with Herbert Baker that played up visual humor that was virtually cartoonish. Kanin did not approve of the new take on his story and requested his name be removed from the credits. Subsequently, Tashlin came up with the new title, The Girl Can't Help It.

== Reception ==
The film received mixed reviews by critics though mostly favorable. Bosley Crowther of The New York Times, no fan of rock 'n' roll movies of the 1950s, felt that Mansfield's performance was underwhelming, stating, "Her range, at this stage, appears restricted to a weak imitation of Marilyn Monroe." On the other hand François Truffaut praised both the film and Mansfield's performance in his book of film criticism The Films in My Life, originally from a 1957 review in Cahiers du Cinéma, and quite favorably compared Mansfield to Monroe.

Variety raved about the film, calling it "an hilarious comedy with a beat". Regarding Jayne Mansfield, the critic noted "Mansfield doesn’t disappoint as the sexpot who just wants to be a successful wife and mother, not a glamor queen. She’s physically equipped for the role, and also is competent in sparking considerable of the fun. Nature was so much more bountiful with her than with Marilyn Monroe that it seems Mansfield should have left MM with her voice. However, the vocal imitation could have been just another part of the fun-poking indulged in."

=== Accolades ===
The film is recognized by American Film Institute in these lists:

- 2006: AFI's Greatest Movie Musicals – Nominated

== Influence on rock music ==
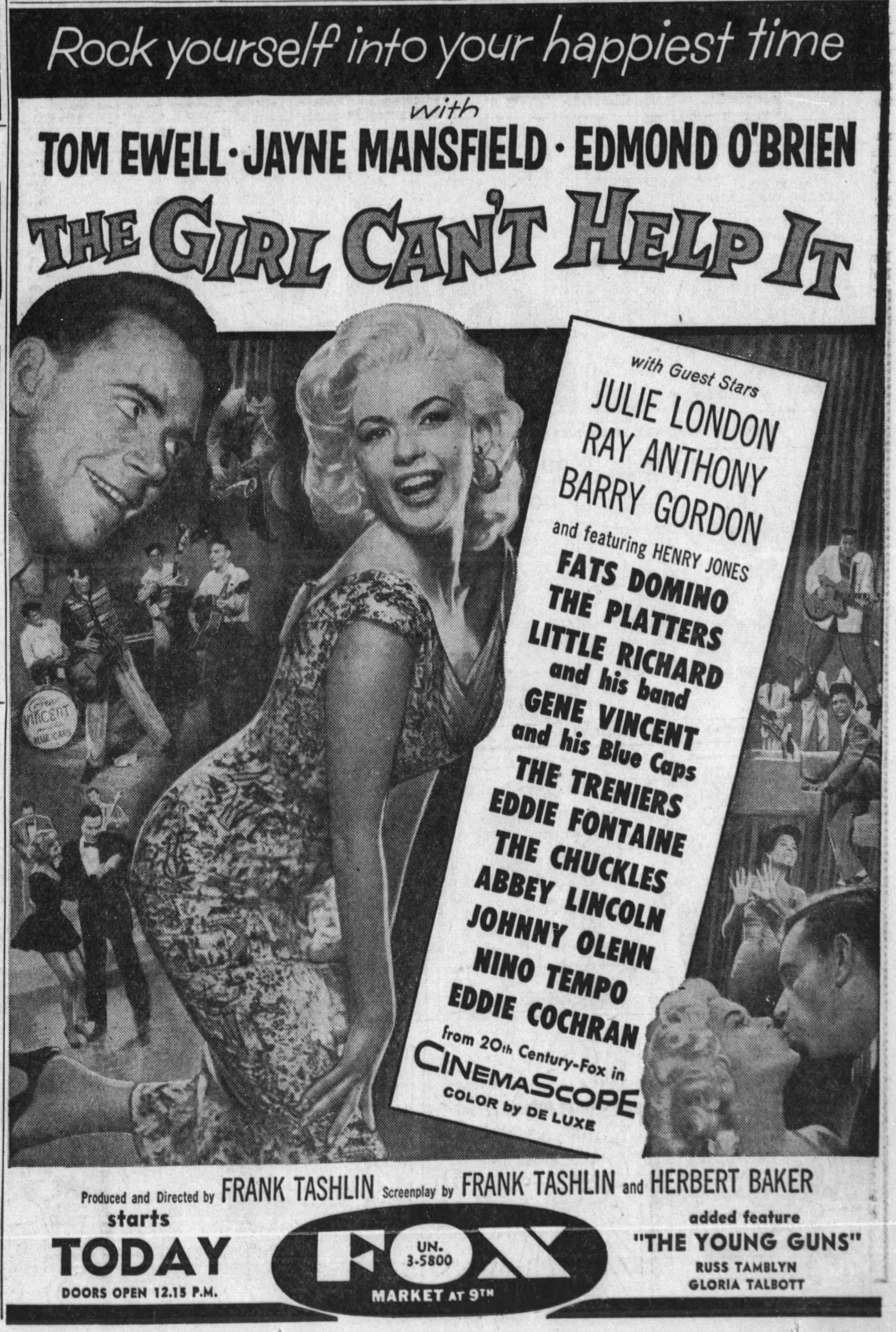
Theatrical advertisement from 1956

The film's influence on rock music is significant. The film reached Liverpool, England, by March 1957. The cameo performances of early rock 'n' roll stars such as Little Richard, Eddie Cochran, and Gene Vincent and His Bluecaps fascinated a 16-year-old John Lennon by showing him, for the first time, his "worshipped" American rock 'n' roll stars as living humans and thus further inspiring him to pursue his own rock 'n' roll dream. On July 6, 1957, 15-year-old Paul McCartney was introduced to Lennon after the latter had performed at a village church garden party with his skiffle group the Quarrymen. McCartney demonstrated his musical prowess to Lennon by performing "Twenty Flight Rock" in a manner similar to how he had seen it played by Eddie Cochran in The Girl Can't Help It. This led to Lennon inviting McCartney to join the group. McCartney talks about the film in the documentary series The Beatles Anthology.

On September 18, 1968, The Beatles interrupted recording "Birthday" at Abbey Road Studios so they could go back to Paul McCartney's house to watch the British TV premiere of the film.

Also, some film buffs have pointed to Elvis Presley's famous performance of the song "Jailhouse Rock" in MGM's film of the same name (often cited as the first music video), released one year after The Girl Can't Help It, as bearing a remarkable resemblance to the theme and performance of a song called "Rock Around the Rockpile" from the earlier film. In that performance, Edmond O'Brien plays a character who seeks to escape an assassination attempt by jumping on stage and singing the lyrics "rock, rock, rock around the rockpile" while backed up by The Ray Anthony Band wearing striped inmate uniforms. O'Brien, then 42 years old, even awkwardly attempts some of the hip-swiveling and leg motions for which Elvis had already become famous, as he had appeared already 10 times, to cumulative audiences in excess of 180 million viewers, and on national television, before and during the filming of The Girl Can't Help It, the production of which commenced in mid-September 1956. Other film buffs point to the famous acrobatic dancer and Presley contemporary, as well as MGM star, Russ Tamblyn (Seven Brides for Seven Brothers), who visited Presley at his suite at the Knickerbocker Hotel on the night before the filming of the "Jailhouse Rock" scene. Presley had had trouble that day at the rehearsals in interpreting what the MGM choreographer, Alex Romero, demanded of him, and Tamblyn's advice at the suite that night helped him perform the first part of that dance sequence (which, incidentally, was witnessed by the then-MGM megastar Gene Kelly). In fact, The Girl Can't Help It's producers had sought to enlist Presley, whose manager, Colonel Tom Parker, however, had demanded too much money. Two uncredited composers on The Girl Can't Help It, Hugo Friedhofer and Lionel Newman, had also composed music for the Elvis film Love Me Tender, in the same year, 1956.

== Legacy ==
The film and its title song are referenced in the Warner Bros. 1985 comedy film Spies Like Us, starring Chevy Chase, Dan Aykroyd, and Donna Dixon. In the final scene, when American and Soviet representatives are negotiating strategic arms reductions by playing Trivial Pursuit, Austin Milbarge (Aykroyd) asks his Soviet counterparts, "What Little Richard song was the title of a 1950s movie starring Jayne Mansfield?" The Soviets incorrectly guess "Good Golly, Miss Molly" and "Great Balls of Fire" and consequently "lose" Eastern Europe's nukes.

John Waters's exploitation film Pink Flamingos (1972) directly parodies The Girl Can't Help It in a scene featuring drag queen Divine strutting through the streets of Baltimore as the self-proclaimed "Filthiest Person Alive", in front of the shocked expressions of actual, unwitting members of the general public, while the Little Richard title song blares on the soundtrack. The song is also featured on the film's soundtrack album.

Canadian rock band Rough Trade used the film's title as a lyric in their controversial 1980s hit "High School Confidential".

The Girl Can't Help It was an influence on the 1993 Australian sex comedy film Love in Limbo. Set in 1957 Perth, Western Australia, and featuring a soundtrack of 1950s rock 'n' roll songs, the film features its teenage protagonists attending a drive-in theater screening of The Girl Can't Help It.

== Songs performed in the film ==
1. "The Girl Can't Help It" – Little Richard
2. "Tempo's Tempo" – Nino Tempo
3. "My Idea of Love" – Johnny Olenn
4. "I Ain't Gonna Cry No More" – Johnny Olenn
5. "Ready Teddy" – Little Richard
6. "She's Got It" – Little Richard
7. "Cool It Baby" – Eddie Fontaine
8. "Cinnamon Sinner" – Teddy Randazzo and the Three Chuckles
9. "Spread the Word" – Abbey Lincoln
10. "Cry Me a River" – Julie London
11. "Be-Bop-a-Lula" – Gene Vincent and His Blue Caps
12. "Twenty Flight Rock" – Eddie Cochran
13. "Rock Around the Rockpile" – Edmond O'Brien; Ray Anthony and his Orchestra
14. "Rockin' Is Our Business" – The Treniers
15. "Big Band Boogie" – Ray Anthony and his Orchestra
16. "Blue Monday" – Fats Domino
17. "You'll Never, Never Know" – The Platters
18. "Ev'ry Time (It Happens)" – Jayne Mansfield (dubbed by Eileen Wilson)
19. "Giddy Up a Ding Dong" – Freddy Bell & The Bell-Boys

== See also ==
- List of cult films
