= The Explosive Little Richard =

Studio album by Little Richard
- Released: January 1967
- Recorded: February 5, 1966 – September 15, 1966
- Studio: Columbia, Hollywood, California
- Genre: Rock and roll, soul
- Length: 29:49
- Label: Okeh
- Producer: Larry Williams

Little Richard chronology
The Wild and Frantic Little Richard (1966)	The Explosive Little Richard (1967)	Little Richard's Greatest Hits: Recorded Live! (1967)

The Explosive Little Richard is the first album by Little Richard for Okeh Records, produced by his long-time friend Larry Williams and Johnny "Guitar" Watson. The songs reflect the then-popular soul and Motown musical styles; no tracks were written by Richard.

== Recording ==
At the time, Richard had wished Okeh would not release this album, as it favored horns over rhythm. In Charles White's 1984 biography The Life and Times of Little Richard, Richard noted he "was in the second year of the Okey (sic) contract and there was still no hit record. So I tore it up. The contract gave me no say in the material I recorded with them or in what was released. Larry Williams was the worst producer in the world. He wanted me to copy Motown and I was no Motown artist. [...] The Okeh stuff didn't sell at all because Okeh was an R'n'B label - a black label. I should have recorded on the Epic label, because I'm not primarily a black artist. It would have done a lot better."

'Poor Dog' made it to No. 41 on the R&B chart, and 'Commandments of Love' made No. 30 on The Cash Box Black Singles chart. All Okeh 45's are highly regarded in Europe where they were released on the Epic label.

== Critical reception ==
Professional ratings
Review scores
Source	Rating
Record Collector	4 stars
Rolling Stone	4/5 stars
AllMusic	3/5 stars
i-News	4 stars

CD reissues have seen the album attract positive reviews. In 2007, Record Collector gave the album four stars, and cited it as "quite possibly the best long player he ever made."

In a review of the entire Okeh recordings, Rolling Stone stated that "Richard's hair-raising vocals on the Motown staple 'Money' effectively claim the song as his own."

i-News reviewed the album for a 2016 vinyl release, giving it four stars and stating that Richard "was still blessed with an immaculate voice and threw himself wholeheartedly some great contemporary sounding tracks."

== Track listing ==
1. "I Don't Want to Discuss It" (Beth Beatty, Dick Cooper, Ernie Shelby) – 2:28
2. "Land of a Thousand Dances" (Fats Domino, Chris Kenner) – 2:10
3. "The Commandments of Love" (Larry Williams) – 2:27
4. "Money (That's What I Want)" (Janie Bradford, Berry Gordy, Jr.) – 2:02
5. "Poor Dog (Who Can't Wag His Own Tail)" (Johnny "Guitar" Watson, Williams) – 3:06
6. "I Need Love" (Williams) – 2:39
7. "Never Gonna Let You Go" (Cooper, Shelby) – 2:41
8. "Don't Deceive Me (Please Don't Go)" (Chuck Willis) – 4:39
9. "Function at the Junction" (Brian Holland, Eddie Holland, Frederick Long, Lamont Dozier) – 2:35
10. "Well (a.k.a. Well All Right)" (Sam Cooke) – 2:56

=== UK CD reissue track listing ===
1. "Get Down With It" (Bobby Marchan) - 3:16 (same tune as “Do the Jerk “, composed by R. Penniman )
2. "Land of a Thousand Dances" (Fats Domino, Chris Kenner) – 2:10
3. "The Commandments of Love" (Larry Williams) – 2:27
4. "I Don't Want to Discuss It" (Beth Beatty, Dick Cooper, Ernie Shelby) – 2:28
5. "Money (That's What I Want)" (Janie Bradford, Berry Gordy, Jr.) – 2:02
6. "Poor Dog (Who Can't Wag His Own Tail)" (Johnny "Guitar" Watson, Williams) – 3:06
7. "I Need Love" (Williams) – 2:39
8. "Never Gonna Let You Go" (Cooper, Shelby) – 2:41
9. "Don't Deceive Me (Please Don't Go)" (Chuck Willis) – 4:39
10. "Function at the Junction" (Brian Holland, Eddie Holland, Frederick Long, Lamont Dozier) – 2:35
11. "Well (a.k.a. Well All Right)" (Sam Cooke) – 2:56
