= Frank Fields =

American musician (1914-2005)

Frank Nomer Fields (May 2, 1914 – September 18, 2005) was an American double bass player who was involved in many R&B, rock and roll and jazz recordings made in New Orleans.

He was born in Plaquemine, Louisiana. In the 1930s, he played with local jazz groups and with bandleader Claiborne Williams. After serving in the US Navy during World War II, he joined Dave Bartholomew's band as bass player, and became one of the key session musicians at Cosimo Matassa's J&M Studios in New Orleans, along with guitarist Ernest McLean, drummer Earl Palmer, pianist Salvador Doucette, and saxophonists Lee Allen and Red Tyler. Fields played on many of the seminal rhythm and blues and early rock and roll records made in New Orleans, including Fats Domino's "The Fat Man" (recorded in 1949), and many of Domino's later hits; Little Richard's "Tutti Frutti" (1955) and his later records on Specialty; and recordings by Professor Longhair, Smiley Lewis, Shirley & Lee, Lloyd Price, Huey "Piano" Smith, Ray Charles and many others. Fields was several years older than most of the other regular musicians. Tyler described him as "about the most steady bass player I've ever worked with.... He plays correct, nothing fancy, very strong and dominant in his bass playing."

He worked as a television repair man at the same time as maintaining his career as a musician. He continued to record as a session musician in New Orleans until the early 1990s. He also played with the Preservation Hall Jazz Band until at least 1994.

He died in 2005 at the age of 91, and was buried at Port Hudson National Cemetery in Zachary, Louisiana.

== Collaborations ==
With Fats Domino

- Fats Domino Rock and Rollin' (Imperial, 1956)
- This Is Fats Domino! (Imperial, 1956)

With Little Richard

- Here's Little Richard (Speciality, 1957)
- Little Richard (Speciality, 1958)
- The Fabulous Little Richard (Speciality, 1959)
