= The Girl Can't Help It (song) =

- Japanese release picture sleeve

Single by Little Richard

from the album Little Richard
- B-side: "All Around the World"
- Released: December 1956
- Recorded: October 16, 1956
- Genre: Rock and roll
- Label: Specialty
- Songwriter: Bobby Troup

Little Richard singles chronology
"She's Got It" (1956)	"The Girl Can't Help It" (1956)	"Lucille/Send Me Some Lovin'" (1957)

"The Girl Can't Help It" is the title song to the film The Girl Can't Help It, with words and music by songwriter Bobby Troup. It was performed by Little Richard and was released in December 1956. In the US, the song peaked at No. 49 on the Billboard Top 100 singles chart and No. 7 on the R&B Best Sellers Chart. Overseas, "The Girl Can't Help It" peaked at No. 9 in the UK Singles Chart. It was ranked at No. 413 on Rolling Stone's 500 Greatest Songs of All Time. Originally, Fats Domino was lined up to record the track, which was not written as a rock song.

== Cover versions and adaptations ==
The Animals covered it on both their US debut album The Animals on MGM Records and their UK debut album also called The Animals, on Columbia (EMI) in 1964. It was also covered in 1965 by the Everly Brothers, in 1969 by the Flamin' Groovies, in 1970 by Led Zeppelin, in 1975 by Mick Ronson, and in 2001 by Babes in Toyland. The first single by UK band Darts, released in 1977, was a medley of "Daddy Cool" and "The Girl Can't Help It".

American singer Fergie sampled the song for her 2007 single "Clumsy". It was also used in commercials for Rowntrees Fruit Pastilles in the late 1980s and early 1990s. The advertising slogan was "You just can't help chewing".

A gender-reversed version, "The Boy Can't Help It", appears on Bonnie Raitt's 1979 album, The Glow. Emerson, Lake & Palmer repurposed the music, with new lyrics, to create their 1971 song "Are You Ready Eddy?", on their album Tarkus.
