= Rip It Up (Little Richard song) =

Single by Little Richard
- B-side: "Ready Teddy"
- Released: June 1956
- Studio: J&M (New Orleans, Louisiana)
- Genre: Rock and roll
- Length: 2:20
- Label: Specialty
- Songwriters: Robert Blackwell, John Marascalco
- Producer: Robert Blackwell

Little Richard singles chronology
"Long Tall Sally" (1956)	"Rip It Up" (1956)	"She's Got It" (1956)

Official audio
- "Rip It Up" on YouTube

"Rip It Up" is a rock and roll song written by Robert Blackwell and John Marascalco. In June 1956, Specialty Records released it as a single by Little Richard with "Ready Teddy" as the B-side. The song reached the top position on the Billboard Rhythm & Blues Records chart as well as number 17 on the magazine's broader Billboard Hot 100. The version peaked at number 30 in the UK Singles Chart. The song was also recorded by Elvis Presley in 1956.

In the Richard recording, the tenor saxophone solo is by Lee Allen.

Also in 1956, Bill Haley & His Comets released a version of the song which reached number 25 on the Hot 100, and number four in the UK Singles Chart.

The song, which was recorded at Cosimo Matassa's J&M Recording Studio in New Orleans, is included as a full-length performance by Earl Palmer with guest vocalist Ivan Neville and house band in the 2005 documentary film Make It Funky!, which presents a history of New Orleans music and its influence on rhythm and blues, rock and roll, funk and jazz. Los Lobos recorded the song for the 1987 Ritchie Valens biography film La Bamba. The song hasn't been officially released on the album but is released on their album El Cancionero Mas y Mas.
