= Keep A-Knockin' =

Single by Little Richard

from the album Little Richard
- B-side: "Can't Believe You Wanna Leave"
- Released: August 1957
- Recorded: January 16, 1957; Washington, D.C.
- Genre: Rock and roll
- Length: 2:22
- Label: Specialty (no. 611)
- Songwriter: Richard Penniman

Little Richard singles chronology
"Jenny, Jenny" (1957)	"Keep A-Knockin'" (1957)	"Good Golly, Miss Molly" (1958)

"Keep A-Knockin' (But You Can't Come In)" is a popular song that has been recorded by a variety of musicians over the years. The lyrics concern a lover at the door who will not be admitted; some versions because someone else is already there, but in most others because the knocking lover has behaved badly.

Early versions are sometimes credited to Perry Bradford and J. Mayo Williams. Variations were recorded by James "Boodle It" Wiggins in 1928, Lil Johnson in 1935, Milton Brown in 1936 and Louis Jordan in 1939. A similar lyrical theme appears in "Open the Door, Richard" from 1946, but from the viewpoint of the one knocking.

Wiggins' version was entitled "Keep Knockin' An You Can't Get In", which was recorded in Chicago, Illinois, in around February 1928 and released by Paramount Records (12662) that year.

In 1957, when Little Richard recorded it as an uptempo rock and roll song, "Keep A-Knockin'" reached number two on the U.S. R&B charts, number eight on the U.S. pop charts, and number nine in Canada. This version is usually credited to Penniman (Little Richard's legal name), Williams, and Bert Mays. Little Richard re-recorded the song four times, on the albums Little Richard's Greatest Hits (1965), Little Richard Live (1976), Shake It All About (1992), and the soundtrack to the film Why Do Fools Fall in Love (1998). The Shake It All About recording features a much simpler arrangement (the only instruments are vocals and piano), and spoken interludes of Little Richard exchanging knock-knock jokes with a group of children.

== Personnel ==
- Little Richard — vocals, piano
- Wilbert Smith, Grady Gaines, Clifford Burks — tenor saxophones
- Samuel Parker — baritone saxophones
- Nathaniel Douglas — guitar
- Olsie Robinson — bass
- Charles Connor — drums

== Recognition and influence ==
Rolling Stone magazine later ranked "Keep A-Knockin'" at number 442 in its list of the "500 Greatest Songs of All Time". An answer song titled "I Hear You Knocking", written by Dave Bartholomew and Pearl King, was recorded by Smiley Lewis in 1955. The drum part on Little Richard's song, played by Charles Connor, also inspired later songs. Eddie Cochran's "Somethin' Else" features an identical drum beat, played by Earl Palmer, as does John Bonham's introduction to the Led Zeppelin song "Rock and Roll". The version of the song recorded by Louis Jordan was featured in the 2015 videogame Fallout 4, as part of the in-game radio station "Diamond City Radio".

Little Richard's version of the song has made numerous appearances in popular culture. It is featured in the Full House episode "Too Little Richard Too Late", performed by Little Richard himself. A version with alternate lyrics was recorded for as the opening theme of the NBC TV series Friday Night Videos. Film appearances include Up in Smoke, Christine, and the theatrical trailer for Home Alone.

== Cover versions ==
Swedish rock band the Shanes recorded a version of the song in August 1964. Backed by "Come On Sally", a song written by the group's lead guitarist Staffan Berggren, it was released as a single that same month. It was their first vocal single following three the Shadows-inspired instrumental singles. It nonetheless became a chart hit, reaching number eight on Tio i Topp on 29 August 1964, staying there for two weeks. Both sides of the single are included on the group's debut album Let Us Show You released in October 1964.
