= John Marascalco =

American songwriter (1931–2020)

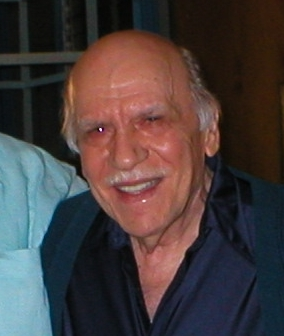

Background information
- Born: John S. Marascalco; March 27, 1931; Grenada, Mississippi, U.S.
- Died: July 5, 2020 (aged 89) Los Angeles, California, U.S.
- Genres: Rock and roll, pop
- Occupations: Songwriter, record producer, arranger

John S. Marascalco (March 27, 1931 – July 5, 2020) was an American songwriter most noted for the songs he wrote for Little Richard. He was born in Grenada, Mississippi and died in Los Angeles, California.

== Career ==
Marascalco co-wrote several of the most seminal songs in 1950s rock and roll. Together with Robert Blackwell, he wrote the songs "Good Golly Miss Molly", "Ready Teddy", and "Rip It Up" made famous by Little Richard. Also for Little Richard, Marascalco co-wrote "Heeby Jeebies", "She's Got It", and "Groovy Little Suzy". He co-wrote the song "Goodnight My Love" with George Motola made famous by Jesse Belvin and Paul Anka. Marascalco also collaborated with Harry Nilsson and co-wrote "Be My Guest" with Tommy Boyce.

Marascalco co-wrote "Send Me Some Lovin'" with Leo Price, which was recorded by Little Richard, the Crickets for their 1957 debut album The "Chirping" Crickets, Sam Cooke, Stevie Wonder, and John Lennon. He also penned "Wouldn't You Know", which was recorded by Billy Lee Riley.

"Rip It Up" has been recorded by Bill Haley and His Comets, Elvis Presley, The Everly Brothers, Chuck Berry, Gene Vincent, John Lennon, Wanda Jackson, Buddy Holly, Gerry and the Pacemakers, The Beatles, Scotty Moore, Cliff Richard, The Million Dollar Quartet, Ral Donner, Shaun Cassidy, Billy "Crash" Craddock, and Los Lobos.

He wrote the lyrics to the 1956 Lloyd Price song "Rock 'n' Roll Dance" which was released as a 45 single on Specialty Records.

In 1961, Gene Vincent recorded his song "If You Want My Lovin'". Harry Nilsson recorded Marascalco's "Groovy Little Suzy" in 1964 under the pseudonym "Bo-Pete", which was released as a 45 single on Try Records.

== Harry Nilsson songs ==
Marascalco and Scott Turner collaborated on songs for Harry Nilsson, such as "I Just Ain't Right" and "Building Me Up," both of which appear on the albums Nilsson '62: The Debut Sessions and Early Tymes. Marascalco and Nilsson also wrote songs together, including "Baby Baby" and "Born in Grenada".
