= Alvin Tyler =

American musician (1925–1998)

Alvin "Red" Tyler

Background information
- Born: Alvin Owen Tyler; December 5, 1925; New Orleans, Louisiana, United States
- Died: April 3, 1998 (aged 72) New Orleans, Louisiana, United States
- Genres: R&B; jazz; blues
- Occupations: Saxophonist, arranger
- Instrument: Saxophone

Alvin Owen "Red" Tyler (December 5, 1925 – April 3, 1998) was an American R&B and neo-bop jazz saxophonist, composer and arranger, regarded as "one of the most important figures in New Orleans R&B".

== Biography ==
Born and raised in New Orleans, Tyler was known as "Red" because of his light tanned skin. He grew up listening to the city's marching bands. He began playing saxophone after he joined the US Army in 1945, and after his discharge joined the Grunewald School of Music. In 1949 he joined Dave Bartholomew’s R&B band, whose other members included Ernest McLean, Frank Fields, and Earl Palmer. He also played jazz in club jam sessions, and regarded himself as primarily a jazz rather than an R&B musician.

He made his recording debut on Fats Domino's first session at Cosimo Matassa's studio, when he recorded “The Fat Man”. He went on to play on sessions for Little Richard, Lloyd Price, Aaron Neville, Lee Dorsey, and numerous other rhythm and blues artists, often helping with the songs' arrangements. According to Mac Rebennack, "Red Tyler was the true leader of the [studio] band but he never got full credit. He would sit down and organise almost every song. He would organise the changes, teach the guitar player to change, have the piano run it down for everybody to learn...". In 1955, he began working for Johnny Vincent's Ace Records as an A&R man, and oversaw sessions by Huey "Piano" Smith, Frankie Ford and others. He also recorded an album, Rockin' and Rollin', credited to "Alvin 'Red' Tyler and the Gyros", with a band that included Fields, Allen Toussaint, and James Booker.

He left Ace in 1961, and helped Harold Battiste found his A.F.O. (All For One) record label, which had a hit with Barbara George's "I Know (You Don't Love Me No More)" in 1962. In December 1964, Little Richard, with Jimi Hendrix, recorded Tyler's tune, "Cross Over". Tyler then moved to California where he recorded with Sam Cooke, Larry Williams and others, before returning to New Orleans in the mid-1960s. He co-owned Par Lo Records (also known as: Olrap Publishing, Inc.), which found success in 1967 with Aaron Neville's "Tell It Like It Is".

From the mid-1960s Tyler worked as a liquor salesman. He also began leading his own jazz band, the Gentlemen Of Jazz, in clubs and hotel residencies in New Orleans, and played with other jazz musicians including Ellis Marsalis. While the baritone saxophone had been his primary instrument during his years as a studio musician, his jazz playing gradually came to rely much more on tenor saxophone. In the mid-1980s he recorded two jazz albums, Graciously and Heritage, with vocals by Johnny Adams and Germaine Bazzle, for Rounder Records. In 1994, he recorded the album The Ultimate Session with Allen Toussaint, Earl Palmer, Mac Rebennack, Lee Allen, and other New Orleans musicians.

Tyler died at age 72 in New Orleans. After his death, the New Orleans Jazz Festival organised a concert in his honor, featuring many leading New Orleans musicians.

== Discography ==
- "Snake Eyes" // "Walk On" (Ace 556, Feb 1959)
- "Happy Sax" // "Junk Village" (Ace 576, Dec 1959)
- Rockin' And Rollin' With Red Tyler And The Gyros (Ace LP-1006, 1960)
- "Olde Wine" // "I Guess" (B-side by Mel Lastie) (At Last 1003, Dec 1962)
- "Hold On, Help Is On The Way" [with George Davis] // "Bet You're Surprised" [B-side by George Davis] (Par Lo 102, Jan 1967)
- Alvin 'Red' Tyler & The Gyros: Simply 'Red' (Westside WESM-529, 1998) CD reissue of LP-1006 with six bonus tracks
- Heritage (Rounder, 1986)
- Graciously (Rounder, 1987)
