= Lee Allen (musician) =

American tenor saxophone player (1927–1994)

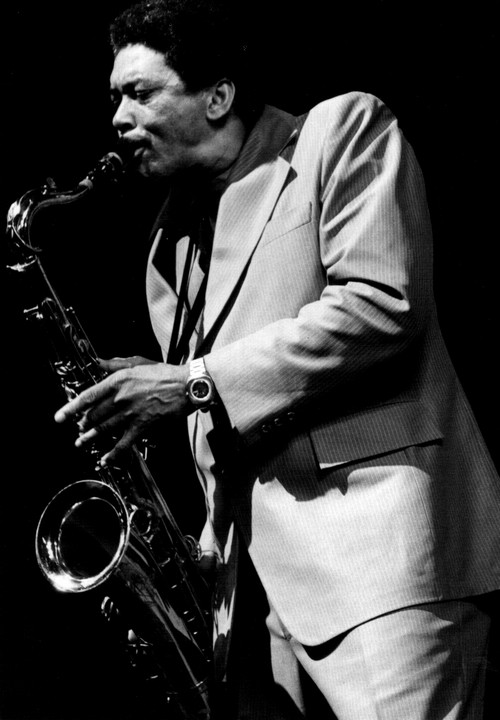
Allen in 1980

Lee Francis Allen (July 2, 1927 – October 18, 1994) was an American tenor saxophone player. Phil Alvin, Allen's bandmate in The Blasters, called him one of the most important instrumentalists in rock'n'roll. Allen's distinctive tone has been hailed as "one of the defining sounds of rock'n'roll" and "one of the DNA strands of rock."

Allen was a key figure in New Orleans rock and roll of the 1950s and recorded with many leading performers of the early rock and roll era. He was semiretired from music by the late 1960s, but in the late 1970s returned to performing intermittently until the end of his life.

== Biography ==
Allen was born on July 2, 1927 in Pittsburg, Kansas, and raised largely in Denver, Colorado. He played saxophone from his childhood. A combined athletics and music scholarship from Xavier University led him to relocate to New Orleans in 1943.

He fell into the city's thriving music scene, performing or recording with dozens of musicians in the early days of rock and roll and rhythm and blues. In 1947, he joined the Paul Gayten Band and later, the Dave Bartholomew Band. Notable are his recordings with the singers Fats Domino and Lloyd Price. Allen also was the sax soloist on most of Little Richard's epochal hits from 1955 and 1956. Earl King, whom Allen backed, recalled that Allen was "part of the wallpaper" at Cosimo Matassa's studio, and that Allen was on all the records by Huey "Piano" Smith. Allen and drummer Earl Palmer also backed Professor Longhair on many recordings.

His own instrumental, "Walkin' with Mr. Lee", released by Ember Records, was a minor hit in 1958, partly because it was frequently played on the television program American Bandstand. This and Allen's subsequent singles are collected on the album also called Walkin' with Mr. Lee.

He appeared in the film Sweet Beat (1959).

By the mid-1960s, Allen found the city of New Orleans no longer the recording mecca it was for many years. So he soon followed Earl Palmer's lead and moved to southern California in 1965, performing only occasionally on tours with Fats Domino. He found work at an aircraft manufacturing plant by day and also fell easily into the thriving R & B scene by night. He formed an organ trio and performed with his close friends T-Bone Walker and Big Joe Turner.

The 1972 album Dr. John's Gumbo by Dr. John features Allen's sax work. He also appeared on albums by Buddy Miles in this period.

After the rockabilly revival got going in the late 1970s, younger musicians sought Allen's distinctive saxophone. He recorded with the Stray Cats on their second album, Gonna Ball (1981).

Allen was a mentor to and eventually a member of The Blasters. He recorded with the roots-rockers on all of their albums except for their debut, American Music. The second and all subsequent releases from the band's original incarnation, on Slash/Warner Bros, featured him on tenor sax as well as Steve Berlin on baritone sax. Allen also toured with The Blasters during the early to mid-1980s. He is visible in the sequence featuring the band in Streets of Fire (1984). He remained a regular guest in later lineups.

In October 1981, Allen played three shows with the Rolling Stones: on October 1 at the Metro Centre, in Rockford, Illinois, and on October 3 and 4 at Folsom Field, in Boulder, Colorado. Allen found it difficult to adjust to the stadium size shows of the Stones and was replaced with Ernie Watts and Bobby Keys for the remainder of the tour.

Allen continued to tour with Fats Domino into the 1990s. In late 1992, he took part in studio dates for what would be his final album: The Ultimate Session, released by High Street/Windham Hill in 1994. The group of New Orleans all-stars featured Palmer, Alvin Tyler, Dr. John, and Allen Toussaint.

Lee Allen died of lung cancer on October 18, 1994 at age 67. He was survived by his wife, Birdie, as well as five children from a previous marriage: Lee Jr., Patrick, Emmanuel, Aaron, and Karen.

After Allen's death, Blasters member Dave Alvin dedicated the song "Mister Lee" (on the 1996 album Interstate City) to his longtime friend and bandmate. Alvin noted that melody was Allen's passion, and that it was what separated him from less sophisticated honkers. Earl King added that whereas other saxophonists would get too jazzy, Allen had commercial appeal.

== Discography ==
- Rockin' At Cosimo's // Shimmy (Aladdin 3334, Sep 1956)
- Walkin' With Mr. Lee // Promenade (Ember E-1027, Nov 1957)
- Walkin' With Mr. Lee / Teen Dream // Promenade / Big Horn Special (Ember EEP-103-45, 1958)
- Lee Allen And His Band: Walkin' With Mr. Lee (Ember ELP-200, 1958; CD reissue: Collectables COL-5083, 1994; second CD reissue [with 10 bonus tracks]: Acrobat ACMCD-4267, 2008)
- Strolling With Mr. Lee // Boppin' At The Hop (Ember E-1031, Feb 1958)
- Tic Toc // Chuggin' (Ember E-1039, Aug 1958)
- Jim Jam // Short Circuit (Ember E-1047, Nov 1958)
- Jim Jam // Funky (Ember E-1047, Nov 1958) re-release
- Creole Alley // Cat Walk (Ember E-1057, Oct 1959)
- Twistin' With Mr. Lee [reissue of E-1027A with new title] // Tic Toc Twist Around The Clock [reissue of E-1039A with new title] (Ember E-1082, 1961)
- Lee Allen And His Band: Down On Bourbon Street [reissue of ELP-200 with 2 bonus tracks] (Nola NLP-16, 1985)
