= Robert Blackwell =

American music producer and songwriter (1918–1985)

- Also known as: Bumps Blackwell
- Born: Robert Alexander Blackwell; May 23, 1918; Seattle, Washington, U.S.
- Died: March 9, 1985 (aged 66) Hacienda Heights, California, U.S.
- Genres: Rock and roll; pop
- Occupations: Musician; songwriter; record producer; arranger
- Years active: 1940s–1980s

Robert Alexander "Bumps" Blackwell (May 23, 1918 – March 9, 1985) was an American bandleader, songwriter, arranger, and record producer, best known for his work overseeing the early hits of Little Richard, as well as mentoring Ray Charles, Quincy Jones, Ernestine Anderson, Lloyd Price, Sam Cooke, Herb Alpert, Larry Williams, and Sly and the Family Stone at the start of their music careers.

== Biography ==
Born in Seattle, Washington, Blackwell led a jazz group in the late 1940s that included pianist Ray Charles and trumpeter Quincy Jones. He moved to Hollywood, California, to continue studying composition, but he instead took a job at Art Rupe's Specialty Records as an arranger and producer. He worked with Sam Cooke, Larry Williams, Lloyd Price and Guitar Slim, as well as producing Little Richard during his rise to stardom in 1955 and 1956.

In addition to producing Little Richard's breakthrough hit "Tutti Frutti" following hearing him sing the song in the studio, Blackwell also produced Little Richard's other mid-1950s hits, co-writing some of them as well, including "Long Tall Sally", "Good Golly Miss Molly", "Ready Teddy", and "Rip It Up". They all quickly became rock and roll standards, and have subsequently been covered by hundreds of artists including Elvis Presley, the Beatles and Creedence Clearwater Revival.

He also produced Sam Cooke's hit "You Send Me". Blackwell left Specialty in 1957, taking Sam Cooke with him to Keen Records. He was the West Coast A&R director for Mercury Records from 1959 to 1963, and produced about an album's worth of Little Richard's gospel recordings for that label. "He Got What He Wanted (But He Lost What He Had)" was a big hit overseas, contemporaneously with his tour of Europe, with the Beatles as his opening act. He became Richard's manager and continued to work with him into the 1970s.

In 1981, Blackwell produced some songs for Bob Dylan's album Shot of Love, including the title track.

In 1985, he issued a 12-inch single called "Give it Up - Pay Little Richard", following Richard's latest comeback the year before .

Blackwell died at his home in Hacienda Heights, California, in 1985 of pneumonia.

== Selective discography ==
=== As co-writer and producer ===
- 1956: "Long Tall Sally" (Blackwell/Johnson/Penniman) - Little Richard, US Pop No. 6, UK No. 3
- 1956: "Ready Teddy" (Blackwell/Marascalco) - Little Richard, US Pop No. 44
- 1956: "Rip It Up" (Blackwell/Marascalco) - Little Richard, US Pop No. 17, UK No. 30
- 1958: "Good Golly Miss Molly" (Blackwell/Marascalco) - Little Richard, US Pop No. 10, UK No. 8

=== As producer ===
- 1957: "You Send Me" (Sam Cooke), US Pop No. 1, UK No. 29
- 1964: "Ooh Poop A Doo" / "Merry Christmas Baby" (Warner Bros.) - Ike & Tina Turner
- 1964: Live! The Ike & Tina Turner Show, US Pop No. 126, US R&B No. 8
- 1967: The Ike & Tina Turner Show – Vol. 2
- 1981: Shot of Love (Bob Dylan)
