= Specialty Records =

US record label; imprint of Specialty Records Inc.

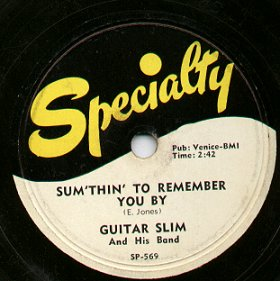
- Parent company: Concord Music Group
- Founded: 1945; 81 years ago
- Founder: Art Rupe
- Genre: Rock, rhythm and blues, gospel
- Country of origin: U.S.
- Location: Los Angeles, California
- Official website: www.concordmusicgroup.com/labels/Specialty

Specialty Records was an American record label founded in Los Angeles in 1945 by Art Rupe. It was known for rhythm and blues, gospel, and early rock and roll, and recorded artists such as Little Richard, Guitar Slim, Percy Mayfield, and Lloyd Price. Rupe established the company under the name Juke Box Records but changed it to Specialty in 1946 when he parted company with a couple of his original partners. Rupe acquired Fidelity, a gospel record label, in 1951 and it became a subsidiary label of Specialty. Rupe's daughter, Beverly, restarted the label in the 1980s.

The major producers for the label were Rupe, Robert "Bumps" Blackwell, Johnny Vincent and J. W. Alexander. Rupe was known for hating the practice of payola, but by 1953, "the only way for Specialty to remain competitive was to pay like everybody else."

Specialty owned music publishing companies: Venice Music for BMI-licensed songs, and Greenwich Music for ASCAP-licensed songs.

The record label was sold to Fantasy Records in 1991 and is now part of the Concord Music Group. The music publishing unit was sold to Sony/ATV Music Publishing.

== Roster ==
- The Blind Boys of Alabama
- Alex Bradford
- Wynona Carr
- Clifton Chenier
- Eugene Church
- Dorothy Love Coates
- Sam Cooke
- John Lee Hooker
- Camille Howard
- Little Richard
- Guitar Slim
- Roddy Jackson
- Jimmy Liggins
- Joe Liggins
- Roy Milton
- Percy Mayfield
- Lloyd Price
- Frankie Lee Sims
- Soul Stirrers
- Larry Williams
- Lester Williams

== See also ==
- List of record labels
