= Frankie Vaughan discography =

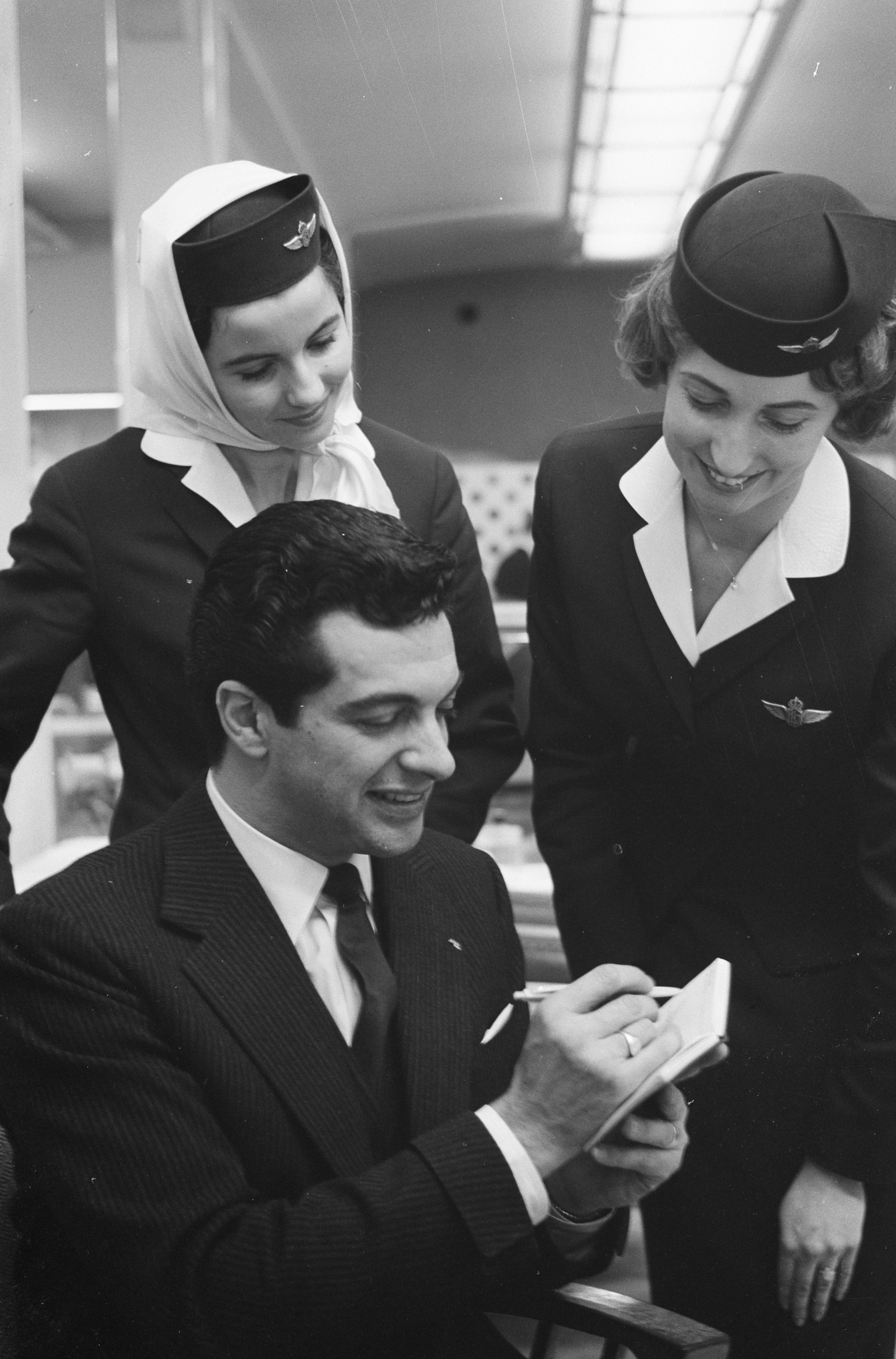
- Frankie Vaughan in 1962
- Studio albums: 17
- EPs: 17
- Soundtrack albums: 2
- Live albums: 2
- Compilation albums: 14
- Singles: 85

This is the discography of English singer Frankie Vaughan. It contains 17 studio albums, multiple compilation albums, 85 singles and other charted songs. His debut single was "Daddy's Little Girl" in 1950, but it would be in 1953 when he hit the charts. His recording of "Istanbul (Not Constantinople)" hit No. 11 in the United Kingdom. Vaughan had several other top-20 singles in the following years, and eventually in 1957 he topped the British charts with "The Garden of Eden". That year, he gained three other top-10 singles.

In 1958 Vaughan hit the Canadian and United States charts the only time in his career. His recording of "Judy" reached No. 35 in Canada and No. 100 in the United States, but during this time his singles continued reaching the top-40 in the UK. In 1961, he topped the UK charts again with "Tower of Strength". The song also topped the Irish charts and marked his first time on the Norwegian charts. By 1965, Vaughan's chart performance declined, and in 1966 his only single "Cabaret" barely registered on the charts at No. 51. The next year, Vaughan returned to the top-10 for one last time with "There Must Be a Way", which was his first single for Columbia.

In 1967, two of Vaughan's albums would chart, a compilation The Frankie Vaughan Song Book and a studio album There Must Be a Way. Another two singles hit the top-40 as well: "So Tired" and "Nevertheless". Vaughan's recording frequency slowed and his chart performance declined heavily. The double LP compilation 100 Golden Greats made the charts in 1977, peaking at No. 24 in the UK. It was his final commercially successful release, though multiple other compilations and studio albums were released after it.

== Albums ==
=== Studio albums ===
Title	Album details	Peak chart positions
Title	Album details	UK
Happy Go Lucky	Released: 1957; Label: Philips; Formats: LP	—
Frankie Vaughan Showcase	Released: April 1958; Label: Philips; Formats: LP	—
Let Me Sing – And I'm Happy	Released: May 1961; Label: Philips; Formats: LP	—
Warm Feeling	Released: September 1961; Label: Philips; Formats: LP	—
My Kind of Song	Released: March 1965; Label: Philips; Formats: LP	—
There Must Be a Way	Released: November 1967; Label: Columbia; Formats: LP	22
The Second Time Around	Released: 1968; Label: Columbia; Formats: LP	—
Mr. Moonlight	Released: December 1969; Label: Columbia; Formats: LP	—
Double Exposure	Released: November 1971; Label: Columbia; Formats: LP	—
Frankie	Released: November 1972; Label: Columbia; Formats: LP	—
Frankie Vaughan's Sing Song	Released: 1974; Label: One-Up; Formats: LP	—
Frankie Vaughan Sings	Released: April 1975; Label: Columbia; Formats: LP	—
Sincerely Yours	Released: November 1975; Label: Pye; Formats: LP, MC	—
Someone Who Cares	Released: September 1976; Label: Pye; Formats: LP, MC	—
Seasons for Lovers	Released: June 1977; Label: Pye; Formats: LP, MC	—
Music Maestro Please	Released: 1979; Label: Chevron; Formats: LP	—
Moonlight and Love Songs	Released: November 1979; Label: Big V; Formats: LP	—
"—" denotes releases that did not chart.

=== Live albums ===
Title	Album details	Peak chart positions
Title	Album details	UK
At the London Palladium	Released: August 1959; Label: Philips; Formats: LP	6
At the Talk of the Town	Released: 1964; Label: Philips; Formats: LP	—
"—" denotes releases that did not chart.

=== Soundtrack albums ===
Title	Album details
Let's Make Love	Released: September 1960; Label: Philips, Columbia; Formats: LP; Soundtrack to the film of the same name; With Marilyn Monroe and Yves Montand
It's All Over Town	Released: May 1964; Label: Philips; Formats: LP; Soundtrack to the film of the same name; Vaughan sings six songs

=== Compilation albums ===
Title	Album details	Peak chart positions
Title	Album details	UK
The Frankie Vaughan Song Book	Released: October 1967; Label: Philips; Formats: 2xLP	40
The Very Best of Frankie Laine	Released: 1975; Label: EMI; Formats: LP	—
100 Golden Greats	Released: November 1977; Label: Ronco; Formats: 2xLP	24
Golden Hour Presents Frankie Vaughan	Released: August 1978; Label: Golden Hour; Formats: LP	—
Greatest Hits	Released: August 1983; Label: Spot; Formats: LP, MC	—
Love Hits & High Kicks	Released: November 1985; Label: Creole; Formats: 2xLP, MC	—
The Very Best of the EMI Years	Released: 1990; Label: EMI; Formats: CD, LP	—
Hello Dolly Part 1	Released: 1991; Label: Royal Collection; Formats: CD, MC	—
The Essential Recordings 1955–1965	Released: 1993; Label: Philips; Formats: CD	—
Give Me the Moonlight – The Best of Frankie Vaughan	Released: 16 February 1998; Label: Spectrum Music; Formats: CD	—
Icons	Released: 2006; Label: Green Umbrella; Formats: CD	—
The Very Best of the EMI Years	Released: 15 January 2007; Label: EMI; Formats: CD	—
The Hits... And More – The Ultimate Collection	Released: 8 January 2010; Label: Jasmine; Formats: 2xCD	—
The Frankie Vaughan US & UK Singles Collection 1950–62	Released: 18 January 2019; Label: Acrobat; Formats: 2xCD, digital download	—
"—" denotes releases that did not chart.

== EPs ==
Title (Note: This is a list of EPs released in the UK. Various other EPs were released elsewhere.)	Details
Frankie Vaughan	Released: 1956; Label: Philips
Here's Frankie Vaughan	Released: 1956; Label: Philips
Mr. Elegant	Released: 1957; Label: His Master's Voice
Frankie Vaughan No. 3	Released: March 1957; Label: Philips
It's Frankie!	Released: January 1958; Label: Philips
Happy Go Lucky	Released: 1958; Label: Philips
Philips TV Series	Released: December 1958; Label: Philips
The Lady Is a Square	Released: March 1959; Label: Philips; From the film of the same name
The Heart of a Man	Released: August 1959; Label: Philips; From the film of the same name
Frank in Films	Released: December 1959; Label: Philips
Swingin' with Frankie Vaughan	Released: 1960; Label: Woman's Own
Favourites	Released: January 1961; Label: Philips
Let Me Sing and I'm Happy No. 1	Released: 1961; Label: Philips
Let Me Sing and I'm Happy No. 2	Released: 1961; Label: Philips
Let Me Sing and I'm Happy No. 3	Released: 1961; Label: Philips
Fabulous Frankie!	Released: 1962; Label: Philips
Sunday Night at the London Palladium	Released: April 1963; Label: Philips

== Singles ==
Title	Year	Peak chart positions					
Title	Year	UK	CAN	DEN	IRE	NOR	US
"Daddy's Little Girl" b/w "The Old Piano Roll Blues"	1950	—	—	—	—	—	—
"Give Me You" b/w "Stay with the Happy People"	1950	—	—	—	—	—	—
"Strange" b/w "My Sweetie Went Away (She Didn't Say Where, When or Why)"	1953	—	—	—	—	—	—
"Too Marvellous for Words" b/w "No Help Wanted"	1953	—	—	—	—	—	—
"Look at That Girl" b/w "Send My Baby Back to Me"	1953	—	—	—	—	—	—
"Bye Bye Baby" b/w "False Hearted Lover"	1953	—	—	—	—	—	—
"Hey Joe" b/w ""So Nice in Your Arms"	1953	—	—	—	—	—	—
"Istanbul (Not Constantinople)" b/w "Cloud Lucky Seven"	1953	11	—	—	—	—	—
"The Cuff of My Shirt" (both sides with the Kordites) b/w "Heartless"	1954	—	—	—	—	—	—
"From the Vine Came the Grape" b/w "She Took"	1954	—	—	—	—	—	—
"Jilted" (both sides with Alma Cogan) b/w "Do, Do, Do, Do, Do, Do, Do It Again"	1954	—	—	—	—	—	—
"Out in the Middle of The Night" b/w "Crazy About You"	1954	—	—	—	—	—	—
"My Son, My Son" b/w "Cinnamon Sinner (Selling Lollipop Lies)"	1954	—	—	—	—	—	—
"Happy Days and Lonely Nights" b/w "Danger Signs"	1954	12	—	—	—	—	—
"Too Many Heartaches" b/w "Unsuspecting Heart"	1955	—	—	—	—	—	—
"Tweedlee-Dee" b/w "Give Me the Moonlight Give Me the Girl"	1955	17	—	—	—	—	—
"Wildfire" b/w "That's How a Love Song Was Born"	1955	—	—	—	—	—	—
"Something's Gotta Give" b/w "Why Did the Chicken Cross the Road"	1955	—	—	—	—	—	—
"Seventeen" b/w "Meet Me on the Corner"	1955	18	—	—	—	—	—
"My Boy Flat Top" b/w "Stealin'"	1955	20	—	—	—	—	—
"This Is the Night" b/w "Rock Candy Baby"	1956	—	—	—	—	—	—
"Honey Hair, Sugar Lips, Eyes of Blue" b/w "Escape in the Sun"	1956	—	—	—	—	—	—
"Lucky Thirteen" b/w "Let's Go Steady"	1956	—	—	—	—	—	—
"The Green Door" b/w "Pity the Poor, Poor Man"	1956	2	—	—	—	—	—
"The Garden of Eden" b/w "Priscilla"	1957	1	—	—	—	—	—
"Cold, Cold Shower" b/w "What's Behind That Strange Door"	1957	—	—	—	—	—	—
"These Dangerous Years" b/w "Isn't This a Lovely Evening"	1957	— (Note: "These Dangerous Years" didn't enter the canonical New Musical Express Top 30, but did peak at number 15 on the Melody Maker Top 20.)	—	—	—	—	—
"Man on Fire" b/w "Wanderin' Eyes"	1957	6	—	—	—	—	—
"Got-ta Have Something in the Bank, Frank" (with the Kaye Sisters) b/w "Single"	1957	8	—	—	—	—	—
"Kisses Sweeter Than Wine" b/w "Rocka-A-Chicka"	1957	8	—	—	—	—	—
"We're Not Alone" b/w "Can't Get Along Without You"	1958	11	—	—	—	—	—
"Kewpie Doll" b/w "So Many Women"	1958	10	—	—	—	—	—
"Wonderful Things" b/w "Judy"	1958	22	— 35	—	—	—	— 100
"Am I Wasting My Time on You" b/w "So Happy in Love"	1958	25	—	—	—	—	—
"That's My Doll" b/w "Love Is the Sweetest Thing"	1959	28	—	—	—	—	—
"The Lady Is a Square" b/w "Honey Bunny Baby"	1959	—	—	—	—	—	—
"Come Softly to Me" (both sides with the Kaye Sisters) b/w "Say Something Sweet to Your Sweetheart"	1959	9	—	—	—	—	—
"Big Deal" (US and Canada-only release) b/w "Honey Bunny Baby"	1959	—	—	—	—	—	—
"The Heart of a Man" b/w "Sometime Somewhere"	1959	5	—	—	3	—	—
"Walkin' Tall" b/w "I Ain't Gonna Lead This Life"	1959	28	—	—	—	—	—
"What More Do You Want" b/w "The Very Very Young"	1959	25	—	—	—	—	—
"The Key" (US-only release) b/w "Hey You with the Crazy Eyes"	1960	—	—	—	—	—	—
"Love Me Now" b/w "I Was a Fool"	1960	—	—	—	—	—	—
"Kookie Little Paradise" b/w "Mary Lou"	1960	31	—	—	—	—	—
"Milord" b/w "Do You Still Love Me?"	1960	34	—	—	—	—	—
"The World We Live In" b/w "The Day That It Happens to You"	1961	—	—	—	—	—	—
"Tower of Strength" b/w "Rachel"	1961	1	—	—	1	5	—
"Don't Stop – Twist!" b/w "Red Red Roses"	1962	22	—	—	—	—	—
"I'm Gonna Clip Your Wings" b/w "Travellin' Man"	1962	— (Note: "I'm Gonna Clip Your Wings" didn't enter the Record Retailer Top 50, but did peak at number 28 on the New Musical Express Top 30.)	—	—	—	—	—
"Hercules" b/w "Madeleine (Open the Door)"	1962	42	—	—	—	—	—
"Loop de Loop" b/w "There'll Be No Teardrops Tonight"	1963	5	—	—	9	5	—
"Hey Mama" b/w "Brand New Motor"	1963	21	—	2	—	—	—
"You're the One for Me" b/w "I Told You So"	1963	—	—	7	—	—	—
"Alley Alley Oh" b/w "Gonna Be a Good Boy Now"	1964	—	—	—	—	—	—
"Hello Dolly" b/w "Long Time, No See"	1964	18	—	—	—	—	—
"Susie Q" b/w "I'll Always Be in Love with You"	1964	—	—	—	—	—	—
"Someone Must Have Hurt You a Lot" b/w "Easter Time"	1965	46	—	—	—	—	—
"The Happy Train" b/w "You Darlin' You"	1965	—	—	—	—	—	—
"Wait" b/w "There Goes the Forgotten Men"	1965	—	—	—	—	—	—
"Cabaret" b/w "I Gotta Have You"	1966	51 (Note: Chart position is from the official UK "Breakers List".)	—	—	—	—	—
"There Must Be a Way" b/w "You're Nobody 'til Somebody Loves You"	1967	7	—	—	19	—	—
"So Tired" b/w "If I Didn't Care"	1967	21	—	—	—	—	—
"Nevertheless" b/w "Girl Talk"	1968	29	—	—	—	—	—
"Mame" b/w "If I Had My Way"	1968	—	—	—	—	—	—
"(Take Back Your) Souvenirs" b/w "Getting Used to Having You Around"	1968	51	—	—	—	—	—
"The Same Old Way" b/w "You Can't Stop Me Dancing"	1969	51	—	—	—	—	—
"Hideaway" b/w "Hold Me Close to You"	1969	—	—	—	—	—	—
"Peace Brother Peace" (both sides with the Daughters of the Cross) b/w "You'll Never Walk Alone"	1970	—	—	—	—	—	—
"I'll Give You Three Guesses" b/w "With These Hands"	1970	—	—	—	—	—	—
"Find Another Love" b/w "Lorelei"	1971	—	—	—	—	—	—
"Make the Circus Come to Town" b/w "What Am I to Do with Me"	1971	—	—	—	—	—	—
"Paradise" b/w "Same Old Love"	1972	—	—	—	—	—	—
"The Good Old Bad Old Days" b/w "The Good Things in Life"	1972	—	—	—	—	—	—
"I'll Never See Julie Again" b/w "Unchained Melody"	1974	—	—	—	—	—	—
"It's Too Late Now" b/w "Somewhere in the World"	1975	—	—	—	—	—	—
"Close Your Eyes (And Love Me)" b/w "Our World of Love"	1975	—	—	—	—	—	—
"Feelings" b/w "After Loving You"	1975	—	—	—	—	—	—
"I'll Never Smile Again (Until I Smile at You)" b/w "Ragtime Piano Joe"	1976	—	—	—	—	—	—
"One" b/w "Love Is Here to Stay"	1976	—	—	—	—	—	—
"Red Sails in the Sunset" b/w "Seasons for Lovers"	1977	—	—	—	—	—	—
"Take Me" b/w "Lemon Drops, Lollipops and Sunbeams"	1977	—	—	—	—	—	—
"Think Beautiful Things" b/w "I Am Lucky"	1978	—	—	—	—	—	—
"Stockport" b/w "Showmanship"	1983	—	—	—	—	—	—
"Dreamers" b/w "Two Different Worlds"	1984	—	—	—	—	—	—
"When Your Old Wedding Ring Was New" b/w "Lucky"	1987	—	—	—	—	—	—
"—" denotes releases that did not chart or were not released in that territory.
