= "Scarface" John Williams =

Background information
- Also known as: "Scarface" John
- Born: October 19, 1938; Port Allen, Louisiana, United States
- Died: March 4, 1972 (aged 33); New Orleans, Louisiana, United States
- Genres: Rhythm and blues
- Occupations: Singer, songwriter
- Instruments: Vocals
- Years active: c.1957 – 1972
- Labels: Ace Records (United States), Rush Records, Fury Records, Sansu Records, Ace Records (United Kingdom), Sundazed Music
- Formerly of: Huey Smith and the Clowns, The Tick Tocks

"Scarface" John Williams (October 19, 1938 – March 4, 1972) was an American R&B singer and Mardi Gras Indian. He performed with the New Orleans band Huey "Piano" Smith and the Clowns.

== Early years ==
John Williams was born October 19, 1938, to Mary Palmer, aged sixteen from Port Allen, Louisiana. Mary was forced to give the infant away at five days old to Adelle "Della" Gatlin Williams. He was raised by Della and her husband Lucius Williams on Terpsichore Street in uptown New Orleans. According to John Williams' daughter Deborah, "Lucius was a laborer. John's mother Adelle influenced him musically because she sang and played guitar and piano. It was told to me that she once played piano for Mahalia Jackson. My father's mother was very religious and only sang gospel music, sometimes on street corners in the French Quarter. She never recorded, just travelled everywhere to spread the gospel." Deborah Williams related to author John Broven, "I think my grandmother influenced John the most because my mother, Mary Marks, said that my grandmother told my father, 'You are meant to sing', and she didn't want him to have a regular job – she didn't want him to do anything but just that. By the age of 18 he was performing. John Williams had a scar that ran from his eye to his chin that was the origin of his nickname. Huey "Piano" Smith said later that the scar proved useful one night when a promoter came up short with the group's money. Smith recalled the promoter told him, "I'm go' pay you now, because, see, first of all my boys are scared of y'all boys, especially the one with the scar on his face!" The scar was the consequence of being hit by a car when he was a small boy.

== Career ==
Huey Smith recruited eighteen-year-old "Scarface" John Williams and Sidney Rayfield (Huey's barber) to join him and sometime vocalist Bobby Marchan in the newly formed Huey Smith and the Clowns. The band was signed to a long-term contract with Ace Records. In early 1957, Huey recorded the song with which he's most identified – "Rockin' Pneumonia and the Boogie Woogie Flu". On the session, in addition to Smith on piano, were sax man Lee Allen, Earl King on guitar, Frank Fields on bass, and Charles "Hungry" Williams on drums. Not caring for the sound of his own voice, Huey instructed John Williams to move nearer to the mic. "Get in closer John," he said. "I'm trying to get a hit out of this."

A parade of musicians moved through the ranks of the Clowns. Williams, who was also a Mardi Gras Indian, sang lead or back-up vocals in various Clown configurations. Huey Smith had an open-minded approach to who sang lead vocals. "Some things like 'Beatnik Blues', 'Genevieve', I figure John Williams can do better than Bobby (Marchan)," Huey said. Williams was the lead singer on other songs for Huey, including "Tu-Ber-Cu-Lucas And The Sinus Blues", and "Quit My Job". He sang with Bobby Marchan on "Don't You Just Know It", Gerri Hall on "Would You Believe It (I Have A Cold)" and "Pop-Eye", as well as on "Just A Lonely Clown", "For Crying Out Loud", "Scald-Dog", and "Talk To Me Baby". Huey Smith and the Clowns, including Williams, recorded the massive two-sided hit "High Blood Pressure" and "Don't You Just Know It", which stayed thirteen weeks on the Hot 100, the latter climbing to #9. It was one of the biggest records of 1958.

Williams was among the many Clowns who left to pursue a solo career, including Curley Moore, Gerri Hall, Bobby Marchan, Issachar "Junior" "Izzycoo" Gordon, and Raymond Lewis among others. John Williams, James Black, and Eugene Harris left the Clowns in the early 1960s to form the Tick-Tocks. They first recorded with Bobby Marchan as Bobby Marchan and the Tick Tocks for Bobby Robinson's Fury Records in 1960. In 1962 they recorded for Robinson's Enjoy Records as the Tick-Tocks, and Rush Records as Johnny Williams and the Tic Tocs. From 1966 through 1967 John Williams & the Tick Tocks recorded for Allen Toussaint and Marshall Sehorn's Sansu Records. Deacon John Moore, who worked with Huey Smith and the Clowns also gigged with the Tick-Tocks at the Dew Drop Inn. "The Tick-Tocks did all the Clowns' songs and some Coaster songs," Moore said. They were like a show group. They had crazy antics and a lot of good choreography, a lot of tumble sets and splits. They would come out in costumes. Some would be dressed as women." Harold Battiste who recorded the Tick Tocks for New Orleans' AFO Records remembered they were "very energetic on stage". At the time, the Tick Tocks comprised John Williams, Eugene Harris, Alvin Carter and a young Walter "Wolfman" Washington. Washington remembered, "That was John Williams' group—'Scarface' John. 'Scarface' had been in the Clowns with Bobby Marchan. 'Scarface' gave me the name Walter 'Wolfman'. My real name is Edward. He said, 'That's no kind of name for a guitar player,' so he tagged me with 'Walter'. The group played around the Dew Drop a lot."

A new Huey Smith and the Clowns recording of "Rocking Pneumonia"- featuring original vocalist "Scarface" John Williams- came out on Atlantic Records subsidiary label Cotillion Records in 1972. It had been recorded along with remakes "High Blood Pressure", "Don't You Just Know It", and "We Like Mambo" in 1970. Williams, was a member of the Apache Hunters Mardi Gras Indian tribe, and "We Like Mambo" contained Indian references.

== Big Chief ==
It was "Scarface" John Williams who contributed the trademark "Mardi Gras" sound to Huey Smith's records. He was a founding member, and later Big Chief, of the Apache Hunters Mardi Gras Indian tribe. Howard Miller, Chief of the Creole Wild West Indians, remembered that as a twelve-year-old he knew a little bit about the Mardi Gras Indian tradition. A few neighborhood kids were participants, including one friend. "I didn't know he masked Indian until I saw him and I stayed with him all day," he said. "A lot of times, back in the 1960s, they didn't tell you nothing about that they were masking. Everything was sealed in that sacred secret mode." Miller told his companion he wanted to mask Indian and his friend said he would take him to meet his chief. "I would go around there (by chief's house) but they never would let me in, and in fact they wouldn't let me in the yard," Miller recalled with a laugh. He finally entered the yard and then went onto the porch. "I'm looking through the screen door and I'm seeing all this magical stuff going on in there." It then started to rain and Miller heard the chief say, "Is that boy still on the porch?' and he finally asked him in. The chief, John 'Scarface' 'Crazy Horse' Williams, had knocked over some beads and Miller offered to pick them up and also sweep the floor. Then the chief said the words the youngster had been longing to hear, "So you want to mask Indian." "That's the chief who gave me my first feather and made me an Indian."

== Brother John Is Gone ==
The song "Brother John", first recorded by the Wild Tchoupitoulas, was adapted from street lore by Cyril Neville as a eulogy to "Scarface" John Williams. Chief Jolly (George Landry) of the Wild Tchoupitoulas stated that it was in 1972 that Williams "got stabbed to death outside a bar at St. Andrew and Rampart. It was right after Carnival when he died. So they made up a song about him, just made up- out in the streets." New Orleans musician Aaron Neville said, "I was close with Scarface when we were teens. He sang with Huey 'Piano' Smith and the Clowns in the early 1950s and then with the Tick Tocks—significant R&B groups in New Orleans. Scarface and I hung out a lot at the Dew Drop Inn on LaSalle Street. His death was a big blow, not only because he was a well-known musician but also because he was the Big Chief of the Mo Hawk Hunters (Apache Hunters) and a friend of our uncle, Big Chief Jolly." "In the case of 'Brother John'", Cyril Neville noted, "I wrote the lyrics in the early '70s with my Uncle Jolly. They're set to a song with an African rhythm that was popular with every Mardi Gras Indian tribe then. James "Sugar Boy" Crawford was first to popularize this rhythm on his 1954 hit 'Jock-a-Mo.' I wrote 'Brother John's' lyrics with my uncle as a tribute to a friend—John 'Scarface' Williams—who had been killed a short time earlier." Art Neville added, "My three brothers and I were all singers and musicians, but we didn't officially come together as a group until 1976, when we sang back-up harmony on 'The Wild Tchoupitoulas' --my Uncle Jolly's album. It was named after his tribe and featured Mardi Gras Indian call-and-response chants. Members of the New Orleans band the Meters were on there, and it was co-produced by Allen Toussaint. That's the first time we recorded Cyril's 'Brother John'." Mac Rebennack remembered, "'Scar' John was a special cat. He saved my life one time. We were standing outside the Robin Hood Club listening to Little Miss Cornshucks when he suddenly said, 'Look out, man.' So I looked out and half a St. Louis brick came sailing past my head. All the Nevilles singing about him was special on that record."

Cyril Neville's lyrics refer to "Brother John" as "a mighty brave, with a heart of steel" who "never would bow and he never would kneel". The reference to Cora in the song refers to "Corrine Died On The Battlefield" a song by Danny Barker, based on a story Barker had heard of a woman killed in a much earlier Indian altercation. According to Paul Longpre, former Chief of the Golden Blades, Cora Anne was a Queen who masked with the Battlefield Hunters. "She got killed in '27 or '28 at the Magnolia bridge... She got caught in a crossfire between the Hunters and the Wild Squatoolas." "There have been many songs about John", said Cyril Neville, "I hope mine expressed that weird mixture of violence and beauty that was part of our R&B street life".

On March 4, 1972, just eighteen days after Mardi Gras, "Scarface" John Williams, the 33-year-old chief of the Apache Hunters, was stabbed in the heart as he tried to stop a fight at a Dryades St. bar in New Orleans. The incident happened a few blocks from Sidney Rayfield's barbershop. Rayfield ran to the scene and lifted his fellow Clown from the gutter. Williams, the New Orleans Times-Picayune reported on March 5, 1972, "wounded in the chest and neck, was pronounced dead on the scene. A seven-inch butcher knife was used." John's wife, Mary, remembered seeing his body lying by a street drainage portal. "The blood was running down the drain," she said. "The blood stayed in that spot for years. Even the rain didn't wash it away."

The funeral procession for Williams was described in the Times-Picayune as "not unlike a traditional jazz funeral", and included the Apache Hunters, Wild Magnolias, Golden Stars, White Eagles, and Yellow Pocahontas tribes accompanying his body from Fourth and Daneel streets to Melpomene and S. Claiborne Avenues. The musical accompaniment was by Mardi Gras Indians chanting and the rhythm of tambourines. The Times-Picayune reported "an improvised jazz band joined in" at the conclusion with a rendition of "Just A Closer Walk With Thee". The procession also stopped to chant and dance at the bar where the chief was slain. "We gonna do our thing outside where he got killed," Golden Star Indian Warren Williams told a Times-Picayune reporter. "Scarface" John Williams was buried in Providence Memorial Cemetery.

== Discography ==
- "Snoopin' And Accusing" b/w "This Is The Life" by Bobby Marchan and the Tick Tocks - Fire 1014 (1960)
- "Stop" b/w "True By You" by the Tic Tocs featuring Johnny Williams - Rush 1042 (1961)
- "Mary" b/w "I'm Gonna Get You Yet" by the Tick Tocks - Enjoy 1006 (1962)
- "A Little Tighter" b/w "Operation Heartache" by John Williams and the Tick Tocks - Sansu 459 (1966)
- "Blues, Tears and Sorrow" b/w "Do Me Like You Do Me" by John Williams and the Tick Tocks - Sansu 472 (1967)
- "Mary" and "Is It Too Late" from Gumbo Stew (Original A.F.O. New Orleans R&B) - Ace U.K. CDCHD 450 (1993)
- "Gonna Get You Yet" from More Gumbo Stew (More A.F.O. New Orleans R&B) - Ace U.K. CDCHD 462 (1993)
- "Somebody's Got To Go" from Still Spicy Gumbo Stew (Original A.F.O. New Orleans R&B) - Ace U.K. CDCHD 520 (1994)
- "Do Me Like You Do Me", "Operation Heartache", "A Little Tighter", and "Blues, Tears and Sorrow" from Get Low Down! The Soul of New Orleans '65–'67 - Sundazed SC 11094 (2001)
