= Charles "Hungry" Williams =

American musician

Background information
- Born: Charles Williams; February 12, 1935; New Orleans, Louisiana, U.S.
- Died: May 10, 1986 (aged 51) New York, New York, U.S.
- Genre: Rhythm and Blues
- Occupations: Drummer, singer, songwriter
- Years active: c.1953 – 1978
- Label: Checker

Charles "Hungry" Williams (February 12, 1935 – May 10, 1986) was an American rhythm & blues drummer, best known for the innovative and influential technique he used on numerous recordings that came out of New Orleans in the 1950s and 1960s.

== Early life ==
Williams was born at Charity Hospital in New Orleans, Louisiana on February 12, 1935, to Henry Sr. and Beatrice (née Henderson) Williams. The family lived in the 2nd Ward of New Orleans at 2522 Howard Avenue according to the 1940 U.S. Census. Henry Sr. was listed as a construction laborer with the Works Progress Administration. Charles Williams was the second son in the family that included siblings Henry Jr., Clifford, Lloyd, and Mary Alice. He said his mother sang a lot because she was church-going, and his father liked to dance. Henry Jr. played guitar and younger brother Lloyd played drums. Williams reported that "ever since I been big enough to know myself I used to be always beating on something, tin cans or something like that."

== Education ==
At age eight or nine years old Williams was put into Municipal Boys Home on Franklin Avenue in New Orleans. His teacher there was Peter Davis, called Mr. Dave by the boys. Davis taught Louis Armstrong to play the trumpet, and encouraged young Williams to take up the horn. "I used to tell him all the time, I say, 'Mr. Dave, I don't like to play trumpet, I want to play drums'. But he kept drivin' and drivin' it into my head, and I learned to play the trumpet a little bit. I didn't like it." When Williams got out of the Municipal Boys Home he moved to McDonoghville, a neighborhood community of New Orleans on the West Bank of the Mississippi River. "That's where I was living, with my parents. After I got out of the home, I went back to my parents. There was a place called the Pepper Pot in Gretna, and that's how I met Professor Longhair. I used to go up there to dance and things, and Fess was playing up there. I'd worry Fess to death to sit in with him. At the time, he had a guy named Milton Stevens on drums. He was one of the best brush men to ever come out of New Orleans. And right after that, after Milton left, I think he got Honeyboy [Charles Otis], plus he had Papoose (Walter "Papoose" Nelson) on guitar. That's all- he only had three pieces. I finally convinced him to let me sit in. My timing and things was bad, but I did the best I could do." Williams' musical education continued when he studied Fats Domino's drummer Cornelius "Tenoo" Coleman. Coleman, left-handed like Williams, also taught Walter "Popee" Lastie. Both Williams and Lastie would later play drums for Domino. Williams said of Coleman, "I idolized the dude, I always wanted to play like him. But, ah, they made me a valet, Fats [Domino] made me a valet. And everytime I got a chance, I'd set up Tenoo's drums like an hour before the gig, and I would sit on his drums and practice before the gig started."

== Influences and technique ==
Williams told Tad Jones, "Paul Gayten and Earl Palmer and all of 'em used to come up there (to Club Tijuana) just to listen to me play, because they couldn't understand what I was doing. I used to, I still do it, I played thirty-second notes with my left hand, and no drummers could do that. Plus I had a mixture. My music, my drumming, is between calypso and rock, you know, blues. I had something different going. Like a double beat on the bass drum that makes it funky. I had calypso going and funk at the same time. I started the 'double clutching' with my bass drum, with my foot. Wasn't no other drummer doing that." Singer, guitarist, and songwriter Earl King agreed, "I've seen him do things with his left hand: I'm still waiting for another drummer to do it. Charles' playing emanated out of the calypso-type stuff." During his time at Club Tijuana Williams often took part in drumming contests with Ricardo Lopez, a Cuban percussionist who played bongos and congas. Williams added Latin effects to his stylistic influences that included marches, country and western, and the music of the Spiritual church of his youth. He said "I'd take all this and hook it up and make a jambalaya out of it, and it'd come out like this funky thing." Williams was known for his experiments with adapting Latin percussion patterns to the drum set. In his playing on Tommy Ridgely's "The Girl Across The Street", the shrill, metal sound he plays on the bell of his cymbal is described by writer Antoon Aukes as an Afro-Cuban cáscara that Latin percussionists would play on a cowbell or on the sides of timbales. In Ridgely's "When I Meet My Girl", Williams came upon the well-known drum set figure of performing the high-low conga accents with rimshot-on-snare and open snare or tom-tom, as he did in Huey Smith's "Free, Single and Disengaged". Ridgely remembered the sessions, "Hungry (Williams) was on drums; this particular beat was his style- nobody could duplicate what he was doing." Record label owner and producer Al Reed acknowledged, "The change came when Funky Charles started playing drums... and a whole lot of people right now aren't hip to his contribution to rock. He was the funkiest thing out. A funky beat was characterized by drummers who improvised to make people dance harder. Funky rhythms went as far back as Congo Square and Second Line, particularly in the distinctive styles of drummers like "Tenoo" Coleman, his pupil Williams, Smokey Johnson, and Joseph "Zigaboo" Modeliste of The Meters. New Orleans saxophonist Alvin "Red" Tyler said of Williams, "This guy had more natural ability than all of them put together. He was another musician that couldn't read a note, but as far as feeling, he would do things on the drums most drummers would say, 'How does he do that?' And it was only because he didn't know he wasn't supposed to do it. In fact Earl Palmer and I used to get off our job and go to the place Hungry was working at." Palmer agreed, "Well, if you listen to the New Orleans drummers you find that they all played more bass drum than the average guy. Listen to “Hungry” play. He played a lot. You know, he sure could play." Palmer wrote in his autobiography, “A guy we called Hungry, Charlie Williams, was a mother on drums, a guy who never knew how good he was.”

== Career ==
In the early 1950s Williams joined pianist Paul Gayten's band during the band's residency at the Brass Rail club on Canal Street. The band included sax man Lee Allen. Gayten later told author John Broven, "For a while I had one of the greatest drummers in the world- that was Hungry Williams." Louisiana swamp pop idol Warren Storm was influenced by Williams' drumming during this time. Warren joined fellow Abbeville swamp pop musician Bobby Charles Guidry in seeking out rhythm and blues artists. Storm and Bobby Charles would visit the Brass Rail and listen to Paul Gayten's R&B band featuring tenor sax star Allen and- at different times- world-class drummers Palmer and Williams. “I think I picked up a lot of the New Orleans style of drumming and brought it down to Lafayette,” Storm said. Through the years he was to give a new dimension to the art of drumming in South Louisiana. Learning from drummer Charles "Hungry" Williams, Warren formed a band in 1956, known as the Wee-Wows (later the Jive Masters). From 1959 through 1965, Storm was session drummer for Jay Miller's studio band in Crowley, La., accompanying swamp-blues stars Slim Harpo, Lightnin' Slim, Lazy Lester, Lonesome Sundown and many other acts.

Williams left Gayten's band in 1953. After working as a poker dealer on Rampart Street he began to sit in with the Club Tiajuana house band in 1954. The band included pianist Huey Smith, saxophonist Robert Parker, and blind singer/ guitarist Billy Tate. Williams soon became a regular member of the band. It was Huey "Piano" Smith who named him "Hungry", Williams said. "I'd order a double order every time I'd eat. I'd have a plate of beans stacked that high, beans and rice. I went up to two hundred and six pounds when I was eighteen years old. I'd be walking around looking like a Baptist mule." It was the Dew Drop Cafe cook, Huey recalled, who noticed Williams' habit of ordering double portions and subsequently described the drummer as "hungry". Smith and other musicians followed the cook's lead, and Charles Williams became "Hungry" Williams.

Williams first worked as a studio musician in June 1953 when Huey Smith cut "You Made Me Cry" and "You're Down With Me" for Savoy Records at J&M Studio. The cuts featured Smith on piano and vocals, Lee Allen on sax, Billy Tate on guitar, Roland Cook on bass, and Williams on drums. In December 1955, former bandmate Huey Smith wrote and played piano on Williams' (on drums and vocals) first single for Checker Records "Mary Don't You Weep, Mary Don't You Moan," backed with "So Glad She's Mine", written by Williams. Paul Gayten, at that time New Orleans A&R man for Chess Records and subsidiary Checker, arranged the session. Gayten set up another session in March 1957 when Williams recorded "Darling" backed with "So Worried". Three tracks from a June 1958 session "Rhythmatic Rhythm", "I Cried All The Way Home," and "What Can I Do" remained unreleased until 1984, appearing on Chess: New Orleans R&B.

== Studio musician ==
During the early 1950s, Earl Palmer was the foremost studio drummer in New Orleans. When Palmer departed for Los Angeles in 1957 Williams became the first choice studio drummer. Mac Rebennack, also known as Dr. John, explained, "I believe it was Eddie Mesner (of Aladdin Records) that offered Earl the job out on the West Coast, and he took it and cleaned up... But this caused a search (here) for a new drummer to take his place, which Charlie Williams eventually got that job. But for a while, they were trying out drummers, everybody from Edward Blackwell, who was too hip of a drummer and he was too jazz-influenced, to June Gardner, who was too straight. There was a search high and low; practically every session had a different drummer for a time. And finally Charlie Williams, who was the funkiest of them all, he just took it." Williams agreed, "Before I knew it, man, they weren't using anybody else. Sometimes, man, I was in the studio six and seven days a week."

Dave Bartholomew led the studio band at Cosimo Matassa's J&M Studio. As an engineer, Matassa worked with producers and arrangers Bartholomew and Allen Toussaint among others to craft what came to be known as "the New Orleans Sound" in the 1950s and 1960s. The key to that sound was the group of studio musicians associated with Cosimo Matassa's studio that included Charles "Hungry" Williams on drums.

Huey Smith recorded his hit "Rockin' Pneumonia and the Boogie Woogie Flu" (#5 on Billboard's R&B chart and #52 on the pop chart) for Ace Records in June 1957. Williams added his distinctive polyrhythmic drumming to that track as well as to Smith's 1958 hit recording "Don't You Just Know It" backed with "High Blood Pressure" (#4 on the R&B chart and #9 on the pop chart). In the late 1950s, Huey "Piano" Smith and the Clowns toured the South including Florida with the Silas Green Minstrel Show. In an interview with writer and funk drumming historian Jim Payne, Clayton Fillyau said the most important rhythmic lesson of his life was taught to him by the drummer in Huey "Piano" Smith's band The Clowns. Fillyau, the drummer who originated the funk beat in James Brown's band, said he saw Smith's show in Jacksonville and caught up with the band's drummer in his hotel room afterward. "Back then musicians were always in everybody's room playing", Fillyau remembered. They started jamming, and the older man, probably Charles "Hungry" Williams, showed him a little lesson in New Orleans drumming, taking him from standard stiff beat-keeping to secrets of the second line. Then he bore down, as if to say it all comes down to this, and told Fillyau, "Now use your imagination. Only thing you got to remember is, 'Where is one?' I don't care where you put it on those drums." Meaning you can hit it on the snare, bass, or cymbal. "Remember where the one is and you'll never lose time." Fillyau acknowledged, "Now this (New Orleans) is where funk was really created! That's where funk originated."

Williams continued to record and perform with Huey Smith and The Clowns. He was also part of the Ace Records studio session personnel that included Alvin "Red" Tyler on tenor and baritone sax, Lee Allen on tenor sax, Melvin Lastie on cornet, Allen Toussaint on piano, Frank Fields on bass, and Justin Adams on guitar, and Williams on drums. Other artists recorded for Ace included Sugarboy Crawford, Benny Spellman, Chuck Carbo, Jimmy Clanton, Joe Tex, Bobby Marchan, James Booker, Lee Dorsey, Big Boy Myles, and Mac Rebennac. Between 1957 and 1959 Williams was New Orleans' premier studio drummer. Using his "double clutch" style, his hard-driving rhythms punctuated and enhanced hundreds of records on various labels with artists like Fats Domino, Paul Gayten, Professor Longhair, Mickey and Sylvia, Smiley Lewis, Hank Ballard and the Midnighters's, Art Neville, Bobby Mitchell, Frankie Ford, Allen Toussaint, Earl King, Bobby Charles, Chris Kenner, Roy Brown, Dave Bartholomew, Lee Allen, and dozens more.

In the early 1960s, Williams lost his position as the first call studio drummer in New Orleans to John Boudreaux, and dropped out of the recording scene. He left for New York as the British Invasion eclipsed record sales and radio play in New Orleans. Said Earl King, "He was one of those who drifted off and got into this whirl and that was it. He was around New York somewhere. Charles Williams, a hell of a drummer." New York City became Williams' adopted home as it had for New Orleans expatriate drummers jazz and R&B stickman Idris Muhammad and Charles “Honeyman” Otis, who played drums with Professor Longhair. Williams' last known recording session was for Albert King's album New Orleans Heat, produced by Allen Toussaint for Tomato Records in New Orleans.

== Later years ==
In his later years Williams made few public appearances. His last was an impromptu jam session at New York City's Lone Star Cafe in April 1985. “I remember Dr. John was playing 'Iko Iko'", said Barbara Becker, a close friend to Williams, “and Charlie thought the drummer didn't have the beat right. So he just jumped up on the stage and took the sticks out of his hands and began to play."

Charles “Hungry” Williams died on May 10, 1986, in New York City after years of battling Paget's disease of bone, a crippling bone marrow disorder.

== Discography ==
New Orleans, La., December 14, 1955

- "So Glad She's Mine" - Checker 831
- "Mary Don't You Weep, Mary Don't You Moan" - Checker 831

New Orleans, La., March 1957

- "Darling" - Checker 866
- "So Worried" - Checker 866

New Orleans, La., June 1958 (Released 1984 Europe)

- "Rhythmatic Rhythm" - Chess: New Orleans R&B - Chess- DET 205
- "I Cried All The Way Home" - Chess: New Orleans R&B - Chess- DET 205
- "What Can I Do" - Chess: New Orleans R&B - Chess- DET 205
