= Curley Moore =

June "Curley" Moore

Background information
- Also known as: Curly
- Born: 1943; New Orleans, Louisiana
- Died: December 14, 1985 (aged 41–42); New Orleans, Louisiana
- Genres: Rhythm and blues
- Occupation(s): Singer, songwriter
- Years active: c.1960 – 1985
- Labels: Teem, Ace, Nola, Hot Line, Sansu, Instant, Scram, House of the Fox, Roxbury

June "Curley" Moore (1943 – December 14, 1985) was an American R&B singer.

== Biography ==
Moore was born in New Orleans in 1943. As a child he sang and danced for pennies on the streets of his neighborhood. He also sang in the New Hope Baptist Church choir. At age twelve he and his friends formed a group they named the Blue Jays, and competed at talent shows. Moore claimed Frankie Lymon and the Teenagers, as well as singing cowboy Roy Rogers, as early motivators. Later in life he recognized Gene Allison, Irma Thomas, Ernie K-Doe, Shirley & Lee and Jackie Wilson as influences.

He began his music career in New Orleans in 1960, as a vocalist with Huey "Piano" Smith's band The Clowns. Moore toured with Smith and The Clowns for three years before leaving to pursue a solo career.

The New Orleans music scene suffered in the mid-1960s when District Attorney Jim Garrison closed many French Quarter music establishments for vice violations. Musician Dr. John said Garrison's actions meant a steep decline for the city's nightlife and music. Many musicians, including Dr. John, moved from the city or went out on the road. During this difficult period in the mid 1960s, Moore had a brief stint on tour in the Midwest impersonating Marvin Gaye. During the 1960s Moore had minor regional hits under his own name. His first solo recording "They Gonna Do What They Wanna Do" b/w "Tried So Hard" was for Teem Records in 1963. In 1965-66 Moore recorded for Nola Records. His first release for Nola, "Soul Train", written by Earl King and Wardell Quezergue, became a hit. He was nicknamed Curley “Soul Train” Moore. From 1966 through 1968 he recorded for Allen Toussaint and Marshall Sehorn at Sansu Records. Sansu issued three Curley Moore releases- “Get Low Down Pt. 1" b/w “Get Low Down Pt. 2", "Goodbye" b/w “We Remember”, and “Don’t Pity Me” b/w "You Don’t Mean". Besides being a vocalist, Moore could play guitar, organ, piano and drums.

The 1970s was a period of struggle for Curley as New Orleans R&B and soul music in general moved toward a harder funk sound and Moore struggled with drugs and gun related issues. An instrumental attempt at this harder sound yielded the 45 "Funky, Yeah" on the House of the Fox label, which became a cult classic for its hard driving heavy psychedelic sound. In 1979, Moore joined a reformed version of the Clowns with Huey "Piano" Smith at the 1979 New Orleans Jazz and Heritage Festival.

After serving prison time in the early 1980s, Moore's murdered body was found in Algiers, Louisiana, in December 1985. He was 42 years old.

== Discography ==
=== Singles ===
- They Gonna Do What They Wanna Do (A) Teem 1002 (1963)
- Tried So Hard (B) Teem 1002 (1963)
- At The Mardi Gras (A) (As Huey & Curley) Ace 671 (1964)
- The Second Line (B) (as Huey & Curley) Ace 671 (1964)
- Soul Train (A) Nola- 707 (1964)
- Please Do Something For Me (B) Nola- 707 (1964)
- Soul Train (A) Hot Line 901 (1965)
- This Way I Do (B) Hot Line 901 (1965)
- Get Low Down (Pt. 1) (A) Sansu 457 (1966)
- Get Low Down (Pt. 2) (B) Sansu 457 (1966)
- Goodbye (A) Sansu 468 (1967)
- We Remember (B) Sansu 468 (1967)
- Don’t Pity Me (A) Sansu 473 (1967)
- You Don’t Mean (B) Sansu 473 (1967)
- Sophisticated Sissy (Pt. 1) (A) Instant 11 -2635 (1968)
- Sophisticated Sissy (Pt. 2) (B) Instant 11 -2635 (1968)
- Back In Mother’s Arms (A) (As Curly Moore) Scram 120 (1970)
- Not Just You (B) (As Curly Moore) Scram 120 (1970)
- Shelley’s Rubber Band (A) House Of The Fox MH- 1934 (1971)
- Funky, Yeah (B) House Of The Fox MH- 1934 (1971)
- Lil Sally Walker (Pt. 1) (A) Roxbury RB 2014 (1975)
- Lil Sally Walker (Pt. 2) (B) Roxbury RB 2014 (1975)

=== Compilations ===
- I Love You Sansu (Unissued until released on Sundazed ASIN: B00005A0B8) (2001)
- She’s Coming Home Ace (Jackson, MS) (1998) from Huey "Piano" Smith – That'll Get It (Even More Of The Best)
- I Tried (Curley Moore With Gerri Hall and Benny Spellman) Ace (Jackson, MS) (1998) from Huey "Piano" Smith – That'll Get It (Even More Of The Best)
