= Frankie Ford =

American rock and roll and R&B singer (1939–2015)

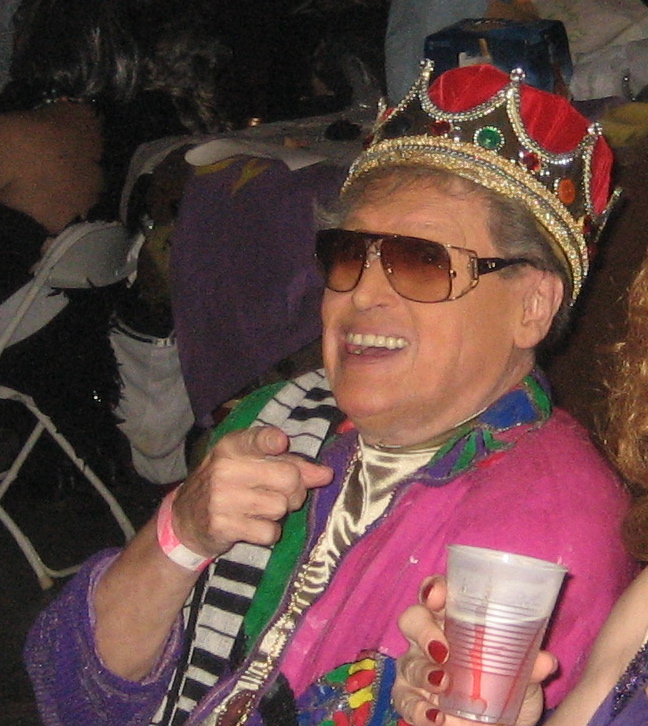
- Ford honored as King of the Krewe du Vieux, 2009

Background information
- Born: Vincent Francis Guzzo, Jr. August 4, 1939; Gretna, Louisiana, U.S.
- Died: September 28, 2015 (aged 76) Gretna, Louisiana, U.S.
- Genres: Rock and roll; R&B; pop
- Occupation: Singer
- Instruments: Vocals; piano
- Years active: 1957–2015
- Labels: Ace; Imperial; Briarmeade

Frankie Ford (born Vincent Francis Guzzo, Jr.; August 4, 1939 – September 28, 2015) was an American rock and roll and rhythm and blues singer, best known for his 1959 hit "Sea Cruise".

== Biography ==
He was born in Gretna, Louisiana, across the Mississippi River from New Orleans, and was the adopted son of Vincent and Anna Guzzo, who named him Vincent Francis Guzzo, Jr. He learned to sing and dance at an early age, and when at high school joined a group, the Syncopators, as singer and pianist. He was spotted by manager Joe Caronna, who took him to Johnny Vincent of Ace Records. Taking the stage name Frankie Ford, he made his first recordings for Ace in 1958. He toured locally in Louisiana, before recording a vocal overdub on the song "Sea Cruise", a song written and originally recorded by Huey "Piano" Smith with his group, the Clowns, and featuring overdubbed bells and ships' horns. As Smith already had a record in the charts, and was away touring, the record label decided to release Ford's version, and it rose to No. 14 on the US pop chart and No. 11 on the R&B chart, selling over one million copies, and gaining gold disc status.

Ford toured widely around the US, but his later records were less successful, with his versions of "Alimony" and "Time After Time" only reaching the lower reaches of the national charts. He also recorded a novelty record in praise of a local TV presenter, "Morgus the Magnificent", with musicians including Mac Rebennack and Jerry Byrne, but it failed to sell. Ace released an LP by Ford, Let's Take A Sea Cruise With Frankie Ford, before the singer moved to Imperial Records in late 1960. He recorded with producer Dave Bartholomew, and released a version of "You Talk Too Much", but Ford's recording missed out in competition with one by Joe Jones which was issued almost simultaneously. In 1961, his version of Boyd Bennett's 1955 hit "Seventeen" was Ford's last chart entry.

Ford was drafted in 1962, and performed for troops in Japan, Vietnam and Korea. He later recorded occasionally for small labels, but mainly performed in clubs in and around New Orleans. He appeared in the 1978 movie American Hot Wax, and toured in Britain and Europe, recording the album New Orleans Dynamo in London in 1984. He continued to record and perform through the 1990s. Ford co-owned the Briarmeade record label, which issued several singles and albums by him from the 1970s to the 2000s. On May 16, 2010, at the Louisiana Music Homecoming in Erwinville, Ford was inducted into the Louisiana Music Hall of Fame.

Ford died in Gretna at the age of 76 on September 28, 2015, following a long illness.

== Discography ==
=== Singles (selected) ===
- "Cheatin' Woman" / "The Last One to Cry" (1958)
- "Sea Cruise" / "Roberta" (1958) - Billboard Hot 100 No. 14 / US Billboard R&B No. 11
- "Alimony" / "Can't Tell My Heart (What To Do)" (1959) - Billboard Hot 100 No. 97
- "Time After Time" / "I Want To Be Your Man" (1960) - Billboard Hot 100 No. 75
- "Chinatown" / "What's Going On" (1960)
- "You Talk Too Much" / "If You've Got Troubles" (1960) - Billboard Hot 100 No. 87
- "My Southern Belle" / "The Groom" (1960)
- "Seventeen" / "Dog House" (1961) - Billboard Hot 100 No. 72
- "Saturday Night Fish Fry" / "Love Don't Love Nobody" (1961)
- "What Happened To You?" / "Let 'Em Talk" (1961)
- "A Man Only Does (What A Woman Makes Him Do)" / "They Said It Couldn't Be Done" (1962)

=== Albums ===
- Let's Take a Sea Cruise with Frankie Ford (Ace, 1959)
- Frankie Ford (Briarmeade, 1976)
- New Orleans Dynamo (Stardust, 1984)
- Hot and Lonely (Ace, 1995)
- Christmas (Avantiavi, 1999)
- Night Songs (Briarmeade, 2002)
- That Can Be Used Again! (Briarmeade, 2003)
- The Legend (Knight, 2006)
- On the Street Where You Live (Briarmeade, 2009)
