= Happy Days and Lonely Nights =

Single by Connie Francis
- A-side: "Fallin'"
- Released: 1958
- Recorded: 1958
- Genre: Rock and roll
- Length: 2:11
- Label: MGM Records K 12713
- Songwriter: Billy Rose/Fred Fisher
- Producer: Morty Kraft

Connie Francis US singles chronology
"Stupid Cupid" / "Carolina Moon" (1958)	"Fallin'" / "Happy Days and Lonely Nights" (1958)	"My Happiness" / "Never Before" (1958)

Audio
- "Happy Days and Lonely Nights" on YouTube

"Happy Days and Lonely Nights" is a torch song written by Billy Rose and Fred Fisher, first recorded by The Harmony Brothers on May 18, 1928. The song was successfully revived in the 1950s in the US by the Fontane Sisters and in the UK most successfully by Ruby Murray.

== Recordings ==
- Ruth Etting made her recording of the song in New York City on 24 May 1928 for release on Columbia Records. This version was ranked as high as #9 on the charts of the day.
- 1928 also saw a version of "Happy Days and Lonely Nights" credited to the Knickerbockers actually by Columbia a&r director Ben Selvin.
- In 1929 recordings of "Happy Days and Lonely Nights" were made by Vaughn De Leath and Eva Taylor.
- The song was revived in 1954 by the Fontane Sisters whose version - made with the Billy Vaughn Orchestra - reached #18 on the US charts. Although the UK release of the Fontane Sisters' version was overlooked.
- Three British-based acts covering "Happy Days and Lonely Nights" for the UK market: both Suzi Miller & the Johnston Brothers and Frankie Vaughan took "Happy Days and Lonely Nights" into the UK Top 20 with respective peaks of #14 and #11 in January 1955.
- A version by Ruby Murray - produced by Norrie Paramor - which debuted that 5 February which became the major hit reaching #6 on the chart dated that 26 February. Ruby Murray set a UK chart record the week of 26 March 1955 when she had five releases in that week's Top 20 including "Happy Days and Lonely Nights" then at #16. Her precedent releases "Heartbeat" and "Softly, Softly" were respectively at #15 and #2 while the first follow-up to "Happy Days and Lonely Nights": "Let Me Go Lover" was at #5. That week Murray's single "If Anyone Finds, This I Love You" (with Ann Warren) debuted at #17. Murray's feat has yet to be beaten but was equaled the first week of July 2009 by Michael Jackson.
- Connie Francis recorded "Happy Days and Lonely Nights" at Metropolitan Studios (NYC) on 2 September 1958 in a session conducted by its producer Morton "Morty" Kraft. Although relegated to the B-side of the upbeat "Fallin'", "Happy Days and Lonely Nights" received enough attention to appear on the Cash Box Best Selling Singles chart at #88.

== Other cover versions ==
- "Happy Days and Lonely Nights" has also been recorded by Ken Dodd, Anneke Grönloh, Dick James, Ginger Rogers, Kathy Kirby, Duke Special and Kay Starr with instrumental versions by UK pianist Billy Thorburn (recorded 2 November 1954), Max Bygraves, Russ Conway, Ted Heath and Phil Tate.
