= Rockin' Pneumonia and the Boogie Woogie Flu =

1957 single by Huey "Piano" Smith

Single by Huey "Piano" Smith
- A-side: "Rockin' Pneumonia and the Boogie Woogie Flu" (Part 1)
- B-side: "Rockin' Pneumonia and the Boogie Woogie Flu" (Part 2)
- Released: August 1957
- Genre: Rock and roll
- Length: 2:14
- Label: Ace
- Songwriters: Johnny Vincent; Huey "Piano" Smith

Huey "Piano" Smith singles chronology
"Rockin' Pneumonia and the Boogie Woogie Flu" (1957)	"Don't You Just Know It" (1958)

Official audio
- "Rockin' Pneumonia and the Boogie Woogie Flu" on YouTube

"Rockin' Pneumonia and the Boogie Woogie Flu" is a song written and originally recorded in 1957 by Huey "Piano" Smith, who scored a minor Billboard hit with it, peaking at No. 52 on the Top 100 chart, and a more successful No. 5 on the Most Played R&B by Jockeys chart.

== Background ==
The title is a reference to "walking" pneumonia and the Asian flu, which hit the United States in 1957–58. The lyrics recount the predicament of the singer who would like to approach a woman he sees in a club (or "joint"), but is unsuccessful due to his musical ailments.

== Musician credits ==
- Huey "Piano" Smith – piano
- Sidney Rayfield – vocals
- "Scarface" John Williams – vocals
- Lee Allen – tenor saxophone
- Alvin "Red" Tyler – baritone saxophone
- Earl King – guitar
- Frank Fields – bass
- Charles "Hungry" Williams – drums

== Johnny Rivers recording ==
"Rockin' Pneumonia – Boogie Woogie Flu"
- Side A of the US single release

Single by Johnny Rivers

from the album L.A. Reggae
- B-side: "Come Home America"
- Released: September 1972
- Recorded: 1972
- Genre: Blues rock, electric blues
- Length: 3:30
- Label: United Artists
- Songwriters: Johnny Vincent; Huey Smith
- Producer: Johnny Rivers

Johnny Rivers singles chronology
"Think His Name" (1971)	"Rockin' Pneumonia – Boogie Woogie Flu" (1972)	"Blue Suede Shoes" (1973)

1972 saw the song become an international hit single for Johnny Rivers, featuring Larry Knechtel on piano as well as other Los Angeles session musicians from the Wrecking Crew. "Rockin' Pneumonia" reached No.6 on the U.S. Billboard Hot 100 during the winter of 1973. It was Rivers' fifth highest charting song and spent a longer time on the chart (19 weeks) than any of his two dozen hits to that date. On the U.S. Cash Box Top 100 the song peaked at No. 5, and in Canada it reached No. 3.

"Rockin' Pneumonia" gave Rivers his third gold record. His final gold record would be with the 1977 hit "Swayin' to the Music (Slow Dancing)".

=== Chart performance ===
==== Weekly charts ====
Chart (1972–1973)	Peak position
Australia (Go-Set)	27
Canada Top Singles (RPM)	3
New Zealand (Listener)	11
U.S. Billboard Hot 100	6
U.S. Cashbox Top 100	5
U.S. Record World	4

==== Year-end charts ====
Chart (1973)	Rank
U.S. Billboard Hot 100	78
U.S. Cash Box	30

== Other cover versions ==
- Larry Williams, in 1957, on Specialty Records, with a back-up band including René Hall, guitar, Earl Palmer, drums, and Plas Johnson, tenor sax.
- The Crickets, on their 1960 album In Style with the Crickets.
- Paul Peek, on his 1966 single for Columbia Records (4-43527).
- Flamin' Groovies, in 1969, on their debut album Supersnazz, and again on their second album Flamingo, in 1970.
- Grateful Dead, on their Europe '72 tour at the Strand Lyceum, London, England, 23 and 24 May 1972.
- Family, in their January 26, 1973 radio concert on the BBC, released in 1991 as BBC Radio 1: Live in Concert.
- Professor Longhair, in 1974, released in 1997 on his album Rock 'n Roll Gumbo.
- Billy Vera, on his 1976 album Backdoor Man and his 2006 album Blue-Eyed Soul Man.
- James Booker, on his albums Gonzo: Live 1976 and King of New Orleans Keyboard.
- Patti LaBelle recorded the song for her 1981 album, The Spirit's in It.
- Aerosmith, in 1987, for the Less than Zero soundtrack.
- Deep Purple, on their 2021 album Turning to Crime.
