= Frankie Vaughan =

English singer and actor (1928–1999)

Frankie Vaughan CBE DL
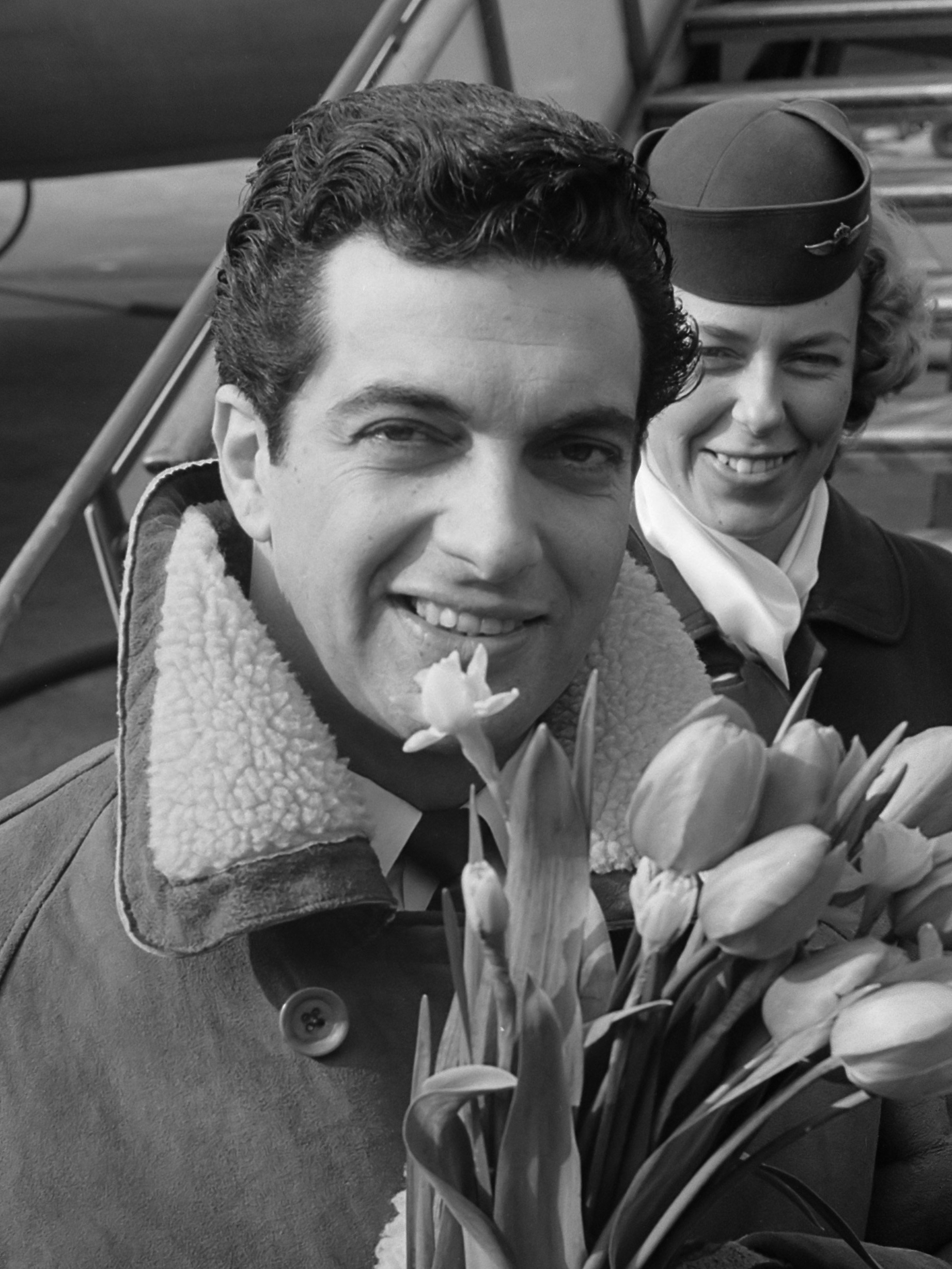
- Vaughan in 1962

Background information
- Born: Frank Fruim Abelson; 3 February 1928; Liverpool, England
- Died: 17 September 1999 (aged 71) High Wycombe, Buckinghamshire, England
- Genres: Easy listening; traditional pop; rock and roll; jazz
- Occupations: Singer; actor
- Instrument: Vocals
- Years active: 1940s–1999
- Labels: His Master's Voice; Philips; Columbia; Pye

Frankie Vaughan (born Frank Fruim Abelson; 3 February 1928 – 17 September 1999) was an English singer and actor who became popular in the 1950s and 60s, recording more than 80 easy listening and traditional pop singles in his lifetime. He was known as "Mr. Moonlight" after his signature song "Give Me the Moonlight, Give Me the Girl". Two of Vaughan's singles topped the UK Singles Chart: "The Garden of Eden" (1957) and "Tower of Strength" (1961). He starred in several films, including a role opposite Marilyn Monroe in Let's Make Love (1960).

== Life and career ==
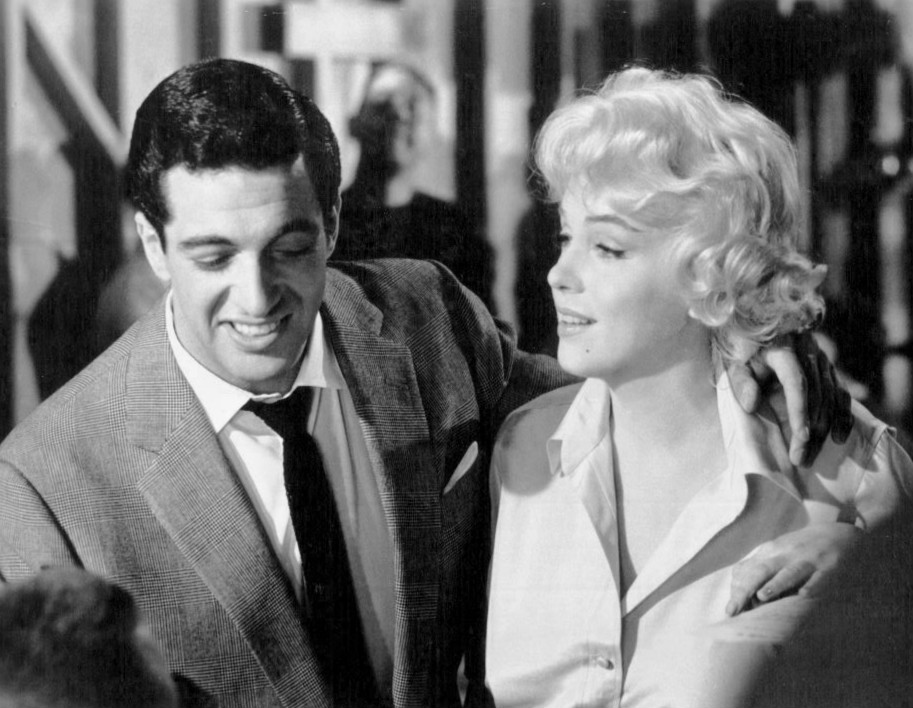
Vaughan with Marilyn Monroe in Let's Make Love (1960)

Vaughan was born Frank Fruim Abelson on Devon Street in the Islington district of Liverpool on 3 February 1928, one of four children of Isaac and Leah Abelson.

He came from a family of Russian Jewish descent and derived his stage surname from his grandmother; as he was her first-born grandson, she called him "Frank my 'number one' grandson", and her Russian accent made "one" sound like "Vaughan". In his early life, he was a member of the Lancaster Lads' Club, a member group of the National Association of Boys' Clubs; having started out at the club intending to become a boxer, he was a major contributor to them during his career, dedicating his monetary compensation from one song each year to them. He was an evacuee during World War II.

He attended the Lancaster College of Art on a scholarship and was a vocalist in their dance band. After a stint in the Royal Army Medical Corps (where he spent most of his time boxing) he returned to art school, this time at the Leeds College of Art. An early appearance was in the Leeds students rag revue It's Rag Time, which opened on 20 June 1949 at the Empire Theatre in Leeds, when he was described as the show's main vocalist. He was still known as Frank Abelson at that time. When he won a prize in a design contest, he left for London, where he won second prize on a radio talent show.

Vaughan auditioned for the agent Billy Marsh, who booked him in for a week at the Kingston Empire in May 1950 with Jimmy Wheeler. Vaughan's debut went well, with press comment stating "Frankie Vaughan gives a promising performance when singing some new and old songs in a crooning style. He receives a warm reception". This led to further bookings on the variety circuit, and he appeared with the veteran male impersonator Hetty King on several occasions. Her guidance helped change Vaughan's style for the rest of his career. He became known as a fancy dresser, wearing top hat, bow tie, tails, and cane.

Vaughan made his first television appearance on 13 October 1951 in a variety show from the Theatre Royal, Leeds, starring Gracie Fields. He was introduced by Donald Peers and sang "Lucky Me".

He made his first records in 1950 for Decca, but there was a gap of over two years before he resumed his recording career with His Master's Voice. In August 1952, he joined the dance band of Nat Temple for around a year, but the popularity of further recordings he made in 1953 encouraged him to return to the variety stage. He switched to the Philips label and in 1955, he recorded what was to become his trademark song, "Give Me the Moonlight, Give Me the Girl".

As was the custom of the day, he recorded a large number of songs that were covers of American hit songs, including Perry Como's "Kewpie Doll", Jimmie Rodgers' "Kisses Sweeter than Wine", Boyd Bennett's "Seventeen" (also covered in the US by the Fontane Sisters), Jim Lowe's "The Green Door", and (with the Kaye Sisters), the Fleetwoods' "Come Softly to Me". In 1956, his cover of "The Green Door" reached No. 2 in the UK Singles Chart. The same year he was voted 'Showbusiness Personality of the Year'. In early 1957, his version of "The Garden of Eden", reached No. 1 in the UK Singles Chart. In 1957, he was voted the eighth most popular star at the British box office. He made several films with Herbert Wilcox and Anna Neagle.

Managed at this time by former journalist and theatrical agent Paul Cave, Vaughan stayed in the United States for a time to make a film with Marilyn Monroe, Let's Make Love (1960), and was an actor in several other films, but his recordings did not achieve success in the US, with the exception of "Judy", which reached No. 100 on the Billboard Hot 100 in August 1958.

In 1961, Vaughan was on the bill at the Royal Variety Performance at the Prince of Wales Theatre, Coventry Street, London. That December, Vaughan hit No. 1 in the UK again, with "Tower of Strength", written by Burt Bacharach and Bob Hilliard. The rise of beat music eclipsed Vaughan's chart career, before he returned to the Top 10 in 1967 with "There Must Be a Way" when he signed Columbia. Major chart success eluded him after this, although he did have two more Top 40 singles; "Nevertheless" and "So Tired".

Vaughan during his later career

In the late 1960s, Vaughan involved himself with a youth project in Easterhouse, Glasgow. He was appalled by the level of violence amongst young people. Vaughan held meetings with the gang leaders and appealed to them to surrender their weapons.

In 1985, Vaughan starred in a stage version of 42nd Street at Drury Lane in London, opposite his old friend Shani Wallis, who had appeared in their first film together, Ramsbottom Rides Again. After a year, he nearly died of peritonitis and had to leave the cast. Vaughan was married to Leeds-born Stella Shock (1924–2022) from 1951 until his death; the couple had three children, a daughter Susan (b. 1963) and two sons, singer and yoga elder David Sye (b. 1961) and actor-singer Andrew Abelson (b. 1968).

In 1994, Vaughan was one of a few to be honoured by a second appearance on This Is Your Life, when he was surprised by Michael Aspel. Vaughan had been a subject of the show previously in April 1970 when Eamonn Andrews surprised him at the Caesar's Palace nightclub in Luton.

Despite frequent bouts of ill-health, Vaughan continued performing until shortly before his death in 1999. He died from heart failure at his home in High Wycombe, aged 71. His wife Stella donated archival materials, including scores and sheet music he had collected throughout his career, to Liverpool John Moores University in 2000.

== Awards and honours ==
Vaughan was awarded an OBE in 1965, a CBE in 1996, and as a long-time resident of High Wycombe had been a Deputy Lieutenant of Buckinghamshire since 1993. He was an Honorary Fellow of Liverpool John Moores University. He also received the Variety Club of Great Britain Award for "Showbusiness Personality of the Year" in 1957.

== Filmography ==
- Ramsbottom Rides Again (1956) as Elmer
- These Dangerous Years (1957) as Dave Wyman
- Wonderful Things! (1958) as Carmello
- The Lady Is a Square (1959) as Johnny Burns
- The Heart of a Man (1959) as Frankie Martin
- Let's Make Love (1960) as Tony Danton
- The Right Approach (1961) as Leo Mack (final acting role)
- It's All Over Town (1964) as himself
- Full Dress Affair (1966, Broadcast 23 May 1966 : penultimate episode of the television show Mrs Thursday, starring Kathleen Harrison)

== See also ==
- List of British Jewish entertainers
- List of artists who reached number one on the UK Singles Chart
- List of performers on Top of the Pops
- List of Columbia Records artists
- List of 1950s one-hit wonders in the United States
- List of people from Merseyside
