= Johnny Vincent =

American record producer (1927–2000)

John Vincent Imbragulio (October 3, 1927 – February 4, 2000), known as Johnny Vincent, was an American record producer for Art Rupe at Specialty Records. He founded Ace Records in 1955 in Jackson, Mississippi, 165 miles away from New Orleans. Although Vincent started out recording local blues musicians, in 1956 he branched out into New Orleans rhythm and blues and rock and roll. He signed Huey "Piano" Smith and his group, who were able to develop a New Orleans shuffle style distinct from the Fats Domino jumping boogie rhythm.

== Biography ==
Vincent was born in Hattiesburg, Mississippi, United States and died in Jackson, Mississippi. He had moved to Jackson in the late 1940s and opened a record shop and started the short-lived Champion Records label in the early 1950s.

Then Art Rupe offered him a job as A&R man at Specialty Records where Johnny worked with John Lee Hooker, Earl King, and Huey "Piano" Smith. His greatest hit was with Guitar Slim's "The Things That I Used to Do" an R&B number one in 1954. He left Specialty to found Ace.

Ace enjoyed several national hits in the late 1950s, such as Huey "Piano" Smith's "Rockin' Pneumonia & Boogie Woogie Flu," and Frankie Ford's "Sea Cruise"; both of which Vincent produced. In addition, the label had a series of Jimmy Clanton hits, but by 1962 the difficulties in distribution for a small independent record label forced Vincent to close down the label.

Vincent reactivated the label in 1971 to produce some new music and reissue the treasures from the label's vault and by leasing the masters to other labels. In 1997 he sold the label to Music Collection International, a British label.

Vincent died in February 2000 in Jackson of heart failure at the age of 72.

== Discography ==
- The Ace Story, Vol. 1-5 (Ace CD 2031-2035)
