= Peter Davis (musician) =

American teacher and musician (1887-1971)

Background information
- Also known as: Mr. Dave
- Born: October 25, 1887; New Orleans, Louisiana, U.S.
- Died: April 29, 1971 (aged 83) New Orleans, Louisiana, U.S.
- Genres: Jazz; folk; spirituals
- Occupations: Musician; teacher
- Instruments: Piano; organ; cornet
- Years active: c.1910s – c.1940s

Peter Davis (October 25, 1887 – April 29, 1971) was an American musician who gave musical training to disadvantaged youths, including Louis Armstrong, at the Colored Waifs' Home for Boys in New Orleans, Louisiana.

== Early years ==
Peter Davis was born on October 25, 1887 at Conti and Robertson Streets in the Treme neighborhood of New Orleans, Louisiana. Scant census information listed his father as a widowed day worker.

Professor William J. Nickerson was a performer and educator who taught many New Orleans musicians including Jelly Roll Morton, Sweet Emma Barrett, and Manuel Manetta. Davis took lessons from Nickerson in the 1890s, learning the piano and the cornet. His took first job teaching music when hired as a warden at New Orleans' Colored Waifs' Home for Boys, a juvenile detention institution. The Home was encircled by barbed wire fences and abutted a cemetery and farmlands. Boys attempting to escape were harshly disciplined.

== Teaching ==
Davis instructed his charges on musical instruments, and also led the choir and quartet singing. According to Waifs' Home superintendent David Dahlgren, he was proficient on multiple instruments and familiar with brass band and dance music. Dahlgren remembered that Davis "gave his entire life and almost every waking moment of his day to working for music for young people." Drummer Abbey Foster, who left the Waifs' Home in 1912, recalled Davis starting a brass band there in 1911. He recalled, "Old man Dave (Peter Davis) got the idea of building up a band." In the beginning the band was made up of snare drum, bass drum, clarinet, two cornets, and bass horn, with Davis later adding additional instruments. He taught the rudiments of reading music to his pupils. Foster (March 20, 1902 – September 12, 1962), also known as "Chinee Bébé", would go on to play in Storyville with William Ridgley's Tuxedo Orchestra, with Buddie Petit in the Eagle Band, and recorded with Papa Celestin’s Original Tuxedo Jazz Orchestra in 1927. While most of Davis' students were taught trumpet or cornet, many others took instruction on piano, clarinet, tuba, saxophone, drums, and trombone.

== Mentor for Louis Armstrong ==
Louis Armstrong arrived at the Waifs' Home for the second time in early 1913, after his New Year's Eve arrest for shooting a pistol into the air. He later wrote, "Mr. Davis thought that since I had been raised in such bad company I must also be worthless. From the start he gave me a very hard way to go, and I kept my distance. One day I broke an unimportant rule, and he gave me fifteen hard lashes on the hand. After that I was really scared of him for a long time." It was at the Waifs' Home that Davis gave Armstrong his first formal musical training. Beginning in vocal groups, Armstrong soon graduated to percussion instruments, the bugle, and finally the cornet. Davis taught him and the other music students fundamentals including breath control, proper embouchure, pitch and tone.

Besides teaching incarcerated boys, Davis allowed other boys to take lessons at the Home after their release. Louis Armstrong and Henry "Kid" Rena were just two of the boys who returned to practice with Davis and the band, according to Rena's brother Joe Rene. Armstrong recalled, "Mr. Davis made the boys play a little of every kind of music." With the assistance of Davis, Armstrong joined the band playing in parades and at picnics around New Orleans. Davis and the Waifs' Home gave Armstrong the opportunity for regular practice on the cornet, as well as showing that he could become a professional musician. Among the many musicians who studied music with Peter Davis at the Waifs' Home and later were Kid Shots Madison, Frank Lastie, Champion Jack Dupree, Dave Bartholomew, and Charles "Hungry" Williams.

== Legacy ==
Davis showed the boys more than just the fundamentals of music. Through his instruction he helped to socialize them, using his methods and lessons to help troubled young boys become men. His verbal manner and formidable physical demeanor provided discipline in the Home. In 1909 W.E.B. DuBois edited a report on the Waifs' Home. Referring to founding director Captain Joseph Jones and Peter Davis, DuBois stated the institution was led by "two very estimable Christian persons doing their best to reform boys." Stephen C. Picou, assistant director of the Louisiana Music Commission called Davis, "a strong, caring, and overlooked giant in New Orleans' history."

Peter Davis identified his occupations as professional musician, Waifs' Boys Home warden and director of music. As a professional musician he performed with the Excelsior, Onward, and Broadmoor brass bands, mainly playing parades and marches.

== Later years ==
Davis retired in 1949. Superintendent David Dahlgren, of the Waifs' Home and its successor the Milne Boys Home, said Peter Davis was "very eccentric" and that he "gave his entire life and almost every waking moment of his day to working for music for young people." Davis never married. Dahlgren thought he might have lived in destitution following his retirement, which came before employees of the city of New Orleans had a pension plan. After his retirement Davis volunteered as a scoutmaster in New Orleans' black communities, taking boys on camping trips and hikes, and taught music to any who were interested.

Davis' last public appearance was in 1965, when he attended a concert by Louis Armstrong sponsored by the New Orleans Jazz Club. Davis entered Prayer Tower Rest Home in 1968 and lived out his remaining years in the facility. He died April 29, 1971, and was buried at Holt Cemetery.
