= Bobby Marchan =

American R&B singer, songwriter and female impersonator (1930–1999)

Background information
- Also known as: Bobby Fields
- Born: Oscar James Gibson; April 30, 1930; Youngstown, Ohio, United States
- Died: December 5, 1999 (aged 69) Gretna, Louisiana, United States
- Genres: R&B, rock and roll
- Occupations: Singer, songwriter, bandleader, mc, female impersonator
- Years active: 1940s–1980s
- Formerly of: Huey (Piano) Smith and the Clowns

Bobby Marchan (born Oscar James Gibson, April 30, 1930 – December 5, 1999) was an American rhythm and blues singer, songwriter, recording artist, bandleader, MC, and female impersonator. He was the key singer in the early lineup of Huey "Piano" Smith and His Clowns along with Gerri Hall and Roosevelt Wright.

== Biography ==
Born in Youngstown, Ohio, Marchan started as a female impersonator in his teens, and formed a drag troupe, the Powder Box Revue. He began performing in New Orleans nightclubs, specifically the Dew Drop Inn and the Club Tijuana in the mid-1950s. He made his first recording, "Have Mercy", produced by Cosimo Matassa for Aladdin Records, in 1954. He then recorded for the Dot and Ace labels, with Ace boss Johnny Vincent apparently offering him a contract under the misapprehension that Marchan was female and releasing his record "Give a Helping Hand" under the pseudonym Bobby Fields.

From 1957, Marchan also toured with the Clowns, the band led by Huey "Piano" Smith, sometimes performing as lead singer and bandleader in place of Smith, who reputedly would stay in New Orleans to write and record while his band played clubs and toured. The touring band included James Booker on piano. Marchan also recorded with the band, singing on Huey Smith and the Clowns' hit records, but only after "Rockin' Pneumonia and the Boogie Woogie Flu" was recorded. "Don't You Just Know It" amongst others during this time had Marchan singing on them.

In 1959, he left the Clowns and resumed his solo career, on Bobby Robinson's Fire record label. He had a number one hit on the national R&B chart in 1960 with "There's Something on Your Mind", a cover of a song written and first performed by Big Jay McNeely, but with Marchan adding lengthy spoken word passages. His follow-ups on Fire, however, were less commercially successful, and in 1963 he signed for Stax Records, where he was assigned to their subsidiary label Volt, on the recommendation of Otis Redding. Two singles were released including a cover of Donnie Elbert's "What Can I Do" before he soon moved on to the Dial label, where in 1965 he recorded his own song "Get Down With It". The song was covered by Little Richard, and then reworked in 1971 by British glam rock band Slade as "Get Down and Get with It", giving the band their first UK singles chart hit.

After moving to Cameo-Parkway Records he had some success with "There's Something About You, Baby", and then his second solo R&B chart hit in 1966 with "Shake Your Tambourine". However, later records on various labels, including Ace, were unsuccessful, and by the early 1970s Marchan had returned to club work in New Orleans as a female impersonator and MC. He regularly performed at the New Orleans Jazz & Heritage Festival. His final studio based work was in 1987 when he released a reworking of his biggest hit, "There Is Something On Your Mind" on Al Bell's Edge label.

He also set up his own production company, Manicure Productions, in the 1980s. In the 1990s his company Manicure was involved in hip hop music booking and promotion including Take Fo' Records bounce music artist DJ Jubilee. Marchan was also involved with the formation of Cash Money Records.

Marchan died from liver cancer in Gretna, Louisiana on December 5, 1999, aged 69.

== Chart hits ==
=== With Huey (Piano) Smith and the Clowns ===
- "Rocking Pneumonia and the Boogie Woogie Flu" (Ace 530) 1957 (No. 5 R&B/No. 52 Pop)
- "Don't You Just Just Know It" (Ace 545) 1958 (No. 4 R&B/No. 9 Pop)

=== Solo ===
- "There's Something on Your Mind" (Fire 1022) 1960 (No. 1 R&B/No. 31 Pop) (Billboard)
- "I've Got a Thing Going On" (Dial 3022) 1964 (No. 25 R&B No. 116 Pop) (Billboard)
- "Shake Your Tambourine" (Cameo 429) 1966 (No. 14 R&B) (Billboard)
