= Sea Cruise =

1958 pop song

"Sea Cruise" is a song written and originally recorded by Huey "Piano" Smith and His Clowns in 1958, but this version was not released until 1971.

The best known version was recorded by Frankie Ford and released in December 1958, with Ford’s voice dubbed over Smith's original backing track (which featured ship's bell and horn sound-effects, boogie woogie piano, and a driving horn section and a shuffle beat that later influenced ska music).

It peaked at number 14 on the Billboard Hot 100 and sold over one million copies, earning a gold disc.

== Original release ==
"Sea Cruise"

Single by Frankie Ford with Huey "Piano" Smith and Orchestra
- B-side: "Roberta"
- Released: December 1958
- Recorded: 1958
- Studio: Cosimo (New Orleans, Louisiana)
- Genre: Rhythm and blues; rock and roll; pop
- Length: 2:46 (A-side); 2:00 (B-side)
- Label: Ace
- Songwriters: Huey "Piano" Smith (A & B-sides)

Frankie Ford with Huey "Piano" Smith and Orchestra singles chronology
"Cheatin' Woman" (1958)	"Sea Cruise" (1958)	"Alimony" (1959)

Official audio
- "Sea Cruise" on YouTube

The song was first released by Frankie Ford in December 1958, sung over Smith's original backing track. On the Billboard charts, it reached number 14 in the Hot 100 and number 11 on the Hot R&B Sides. Released on Ace Records, it sold over one million copies, gaining gold disc status. The single included ship's bell and horn sound-effects, as well as boogie piano, a driving horn section and a shuffle beat that later influenced ska music.

== Smith version ==
"Sea Cruise"

Song by Huey "Piano" Smith and His Clowns
- Released: 1971
- Recorded: 1958
- Length: 2:38
- Label: Ace
- Songwriter: Huey "Piano" Smith and His Clowns

Official audio
- "Sea Cruise" on YouTube

Although it was recorded in 1958, Smith’s recording was not released until the 1971 Ace Records compilation Huey "Piano" Smith's Rock & Roll Revival!

== Cover versions ==
It was later also covered by:

- Charlie Drake released a comedy version in the UK in 1959
- Jackie Edwards recorded a ska version in 1964
- Mickie Most covered it in 1964 Columbia DB 7180
- Herman's Hermits included it on the album Introducing Herman's Hermits in 1965.
- The Hondells covered the song in the 1960s, as seen on a Scopitone film
- Freddy Cannon covered it in a 1968 single released by "We Make Rock'N Roll Records" number 1604
- Shakin' Stevens and the Sunsets included the track on their album, I'm No J.D. 1971 which was released again in 1981 as "Shakin' Stevens & The Sunsets"
- The Houseshakers in Demolition Rock (1972) (available on CD Contours Of Rock 'n' Roll Raucous Records)
- Sha Na Na on The Night Is Still Young and Golden Age Of Rock 'n' Roll (both 1972)
- Jerry Lee Lewis in 1973 for his album The Session.
- Commander Cody and His Lost Planet Airmen covered the song in 1973
- Johnny Rivers recorded a studio version in 1971 and covered it in 1974 on the album Last Boogie in Paris
- The Glitter Band recorded their take for their album, Hey! (1974)
- John Fogerty covered it on his self-titled 1975 solo album
- Nicky Hopkins in 1975 on the album No More Changes
- The Beach Boys, recorded c. 1976 for initial inclusion on 15 Big Ones (released on the 1981 compilation album Ten Years of Harmony featuring a vocal by Dennis Wilson)
- Robert Gordon and Link Wray worked their rendition on their 1977 album Fresh Fish Special.
- Johnny Hallyday on his C'est la vie album (1977).
- Rory Gallagher performed the song live in 1978–1979. The version from Wiesbaden, Germany, May 6, 1979, was included on his DVD At Rockpalast. Another version from December 1979 was released on Notes from San Francisco
- Showaddywaddy on their 1979 album Crepes & Drapes.
- Billy "Crash" Craddock in 1980 on the album Changes.
- Rico Rodriguez recorded an instrumental version in 1980 with The Specials.
- Don McLean on his 1981 album Believers
- Glenn Frey recorded the song on his first solo album, No Fun Aloud, in 1982, after having performed it with Eagles on the same year of their breakup, 1980
- Anne Murray performed the song in her 1983 TV special Anne Murray: Caribbean Cruise
- The Kidsongs Kids did a version on their 1986 video "What I Want to Be!"
- Lindisfarne on their 1987 album, C'Mon Everybody
- Cliff Richard covered it on his 1990 live album From a Distance: The Event and then again with the Shadows on their 2009 album Reunited.
- Dion recorded it in 1990 on the album The Adventures of Ford Fairlane.
- American R&B and boogie-woogie pianist and singer Little Willie Littlefield recorded a version for his 1997 album The Red One.
- Jimmy Buffett on the 1995 album Margaritaville Cafe: Late Night Gumbo. It also appeared on M.O.M. – Music for our mother ocean – Vol 3 in 1999, and Jimmy's Live in Mansfield, MA CD released in 2004
- Status Quo put it out as a B-Side on their 1999 single, "The Way It Goes."
- Gemmy Industries used it for their novelty toy Rocky the Singing Lobster in 2000
- Yo La Tengo for their 2006 covers album Yo La Tengo Is Murdering the Classics

== Song in other media ==
- The song has been included in several soundtracks, including Gallagher's stand-up special Overboard, Ski Patrol in 1990 and Out to Sea in 1997.

== See also ==
- List of 1950s one-hit wonders in the United States
