= Give Me the Moonlight, Give Me the Girl =

- Sheet music cover

Song
- Published: 1917
- Composer(s): Albert Von Tilzer
- Lyricist(s): Lew Brown

"Give Me the Moonlight, Give Me the Girl" is a popular song written by Albert Von Tilzer with lyrics by Lew Brown. It was published in 1917, and first recorded in September of that year by Samuel Ash for the Columbia Graphophone Company, as "Give Me the Moonlight: Give Me the Girl (And Leave the Rest to Me)". In 1918, it was recorded by Elsie Janis.

The song was initially popularised in Britain by music hall star Fred Barnes. It was revived in 1955 by singer Frankie Vaughan. Originally released as the B-side of his single "Tweedlee-Dee", it later became Vaughan's signature song, the title of later compilations of his recordings, and the basis of his nickname "Mr. Moonlight".

Other recordings of the song were made by the Terry Shand Orchestra (1940), Jerry Vale (1959), and Sammy Davis Jr. (1964).
