= Phil Tate =

English bandleader (1922–2005)

John Philip Tate (28 April 1922 – 9 December 2005) was an English dance bandleader.

Born in Bramley, Leeds, Yorkshire, England, Tate played violin from the age of eight, and was later an autodidact on clarinet and saxophone. He formed his own group, the Five Quavers, while in high school, and played in the RAF Silver Wings Dance Orchestra during World War II. The ensemble proved so cohesive that all twelve of its members decided to continue playing together after the war, under the name Phil Tate & His Orchestra, taking a residency at Leas Cliff Hall in Folkestone. Their instrumentation was unusual, featuring five saxes and three flutes. After appearing in the 1951 film Green Grow the Rushes, they took their next residency at the Hammersmith Palais and signed to Oriole Records.

Tate's orchestra played at the Hammersmith for a full decade, then moved to the Ilford Palais. Tate hosted the BBC show Non-Stop-Pop, where he interviewed The Beatles on 30 July 1963. On radio, he was best known for his 144 appearances in Music While You Work. In 1964, his orchestra took up at the Locarno Ballroom in Streatham; the next year they appeared on the BBC program Music Through Midnight. Tate's most longstanding association came in 1965, when he became musical director for the Miss World Pageant. He disbanded his orchestra in 1967, and ran Mecca Agencies in addition to his duties with Miss World, where he remained until his retirement in 1992.

He served as director of the Music Users' Council from 1992 to 2000, after which he retired.

Tate died on 9 December 2005, at the age of 83.
