= John Broven =

British music historian and producer

- Born: 4 November 1942 (age 82); Maidstone, Kent, England
- Occupation(s): Music historian, author

John Broven (born 4 November 1942) is a British music historian, author, and reissue producer who has written about blues and R&B music in the United States. He was inducted into the Louisiana Hall of Fame in 1995.

He was born in Maidstone, Kent, England and attended Bexhill Grammar School in Sussex, where he became friendly with Mike Leadbitter. After leaving school, he worked for the Midland Bank, a career that he maintained for over thirty years. He began writing for Blues Unlimited in 1963, maintaining his input to the magazine as a hobby until about 1978. In the 1970s and 1980s, he wrote many liner notes for blues CD reissues. In 1985, he co-founded Juke Blues magazine with Cilla Huggins and Bez Turner. From 1991 until about 2006, he worked for reissue company Ace Records.

Broven made his first trip to Louisiana in 1970, when he met musicians Archibald, Professor Longhair and Huey "Piano" Smith. His first book, Walking to New Orleans (issued in the U.S. as Rhythm & Blues in New Orleans) was published in 1974. It was followed in 1983 by South to Louisiana. An article in The Advocate described his books on Louisiana music history as definitive. His book was featured on New Orleans radio station WWNO. American Songwriter and Pop Matters also gave Record Makers and Breakers, which was published in 2008, favourable reviews.

Broven has also lectured and made radio broadcasts covering the history of R&B music.

== Bibliography ==
- Rhythm and Blues in New Orleans, Pelican Publishing 1977 (original version published as Walking to New Orleans in 1974. It was updated in 2015)
- South to Louisiana: The Music of the Cajun Bayous, Pelican Publishing, 1983
- Record Makers and Breakers, University of Illinois Press, 2009
