= It's All Over Town =

1964 British film by Douglas Hickox

- Theatrical poster
- Directed by: Douglas Hickox
- Written by: Stewart Farrar
- Produced by: Jacques de Lane Lea
- Starring: Frankie Vaughan; Lance Percival; Willie Rushton
- Cinematography: Martin Curtis
- Edited by: Maria Moruzzi
- Music by: Ivor Raymonde
- Release date: 1964
- Country: United Kingdom
- Language: English

It's All Over Town is a 1964 British musical second feature ('B') film directed by Douglas Hickox and starring Frankie Vaughan, Lance Percival and Willie Rushton. It includes songs performed by Vaughan, The Springfields, Clodagh Rodgers, The Bachelors, Acker Bilk and The Hollies. It was written by Stewart Farrar.

== Plot ==
A daydreaming stage technician and his friend imagine a romp around London's entertainment spots.

== Cast ==
- Frankie Vaughan as himself
- Lance Percival as Richard Abel
- Willie Rushton as fat friend
- Acker Bilk as himself
- The Springfields as themselves
- The Hollies as themselves
- The Bachelors as themselves
- Clodagh Rogers as herself (billed as Cloda Rogers)
- Wayne Gibson as himself
- Jan and Kelly as themselves
- Ivor Cutler as salvationist
- Ingrid Anthofer as herself
- April Olrich as Russian dancer
- Stephen Jack as narrator

== Production ==
Hickox said they shot it in 15 days without sound and the "script consisted of two tiny typewritten pages, badly typewritten at that."

== Reception ==
The Monthly Film Bulletin wrote: "Variety is aimed at – and achieved – by the various singers and vocal groups, taking in straight ballads, comedy numbers, guitar-twanging rhythmic numbers with close-harmony singing and an almost falsetto delivery ... and the quasi-jazz contributions of Mr. Acker Bilk, including an arrangement of "The Volga Boatmen" complete with Russian dancer (April Olrich) and tame bear. Old-style chorus girl routines are Out, replaced by "The Bunnies" – twisting hostesses from the Raymond Revuebar Club, which also supplies the naughty-but-nice striptease act of Ingrid Anthofer. .... The naughty note is echoed elsewhere, notably in Mr. Acker Bilk's rendition of the lyrics of "Sippin' cider beside 'er" – most enjoyable, this – and in the swift education of squares, prophets of doom and eccentric Salvation Army-ists, who are quickly and easily introduced to the joys of imbibing and ogling. All good fun. Or is it? Perhaps the psychologist might read a wealth of meaning in the extrovert antics of this superficial musical charade. Certainly it has an "A" certificate, extraordinary for a pop film."
