= Let's Make Love =

1960 film by George Cukor

- Theatrical release poster
- Directed by: George Cukor
- Written by: Norman Krasna; Hal Kanter; Arthur Miller
- Produced by: Jerry Wald
- Starring: Marilyn Monroe; Yves Montand; Tony Randall; Frankie Vaughan
- Cinematography: Daniel L. Fapp
- Edited by: David Bretherton
- Music by: Lionel Newman; Earle Hagen
- Distributed by: Twentieth Century-Fox Film Corporation
- Release date: September 8, 1960
- Running time: 119 minutes
- Country: United States
- Language: English
- Budget: $3.6 million
- Box office: $6.5 million

Let's Make Love is a 1960 American musical romantic comedy film made by 20th Century Fox in DeLuxe Color and CinemaScope. Directed by George Cukor and produced by Jerry Wald from a screenplay by Norman Krasna, Hal Kanter and Arthur Miller, the film stars Marilyn Monroe, Yves Montand, Tony Randall, and Frankie Vaughan. It would be Monroe's last musical film performance.

== Plot ==
The plot revolves around billionaire Jean-Marc Clément who learns that he is to be satirized in an off-Broadway revue. After going to the theatre, he sees Amanda Dell rehearsing the Cole Porter song "My Heart Belongs to Daddy", and, by accident, the director thinks he is an actor suitable to play himself in the revue. Clément takes the part in order to see more of Amanda and plays along with the mistaken identity, going by the name Alexander Dumas. While rehearsing, Clément finds himself growing jealous of Amanda's attentions to actor Tony Danton, unaware that she only wants to help Tony achieve stardom. In order to impress Amanda, Clément hires Milton Berle, Gene Kelly, and Bing Crosby (all playing themselves) to teach him how to deliver jokes, dance, and sing, respectively. Clément even goes as far as to indirectly fully fund the revue after one of his employees, who had raised him all his life, tries to put an end to the revue by demanding a full year's rent for the theater. Throughout this, Clément and Amanda fall in love.

Eventually, Clément decides to confess the truth to Amanda, who reacts by assuming that he has gotten overwhelmed by method acting and needs to see a therapist. He eventually manages to convince her of his true identity after tricking her and the revue director into coming to his offices. Amanda is initially indignant over the deception but swiftly forgives him after the two make up in the building's elevator.

== Cast ==
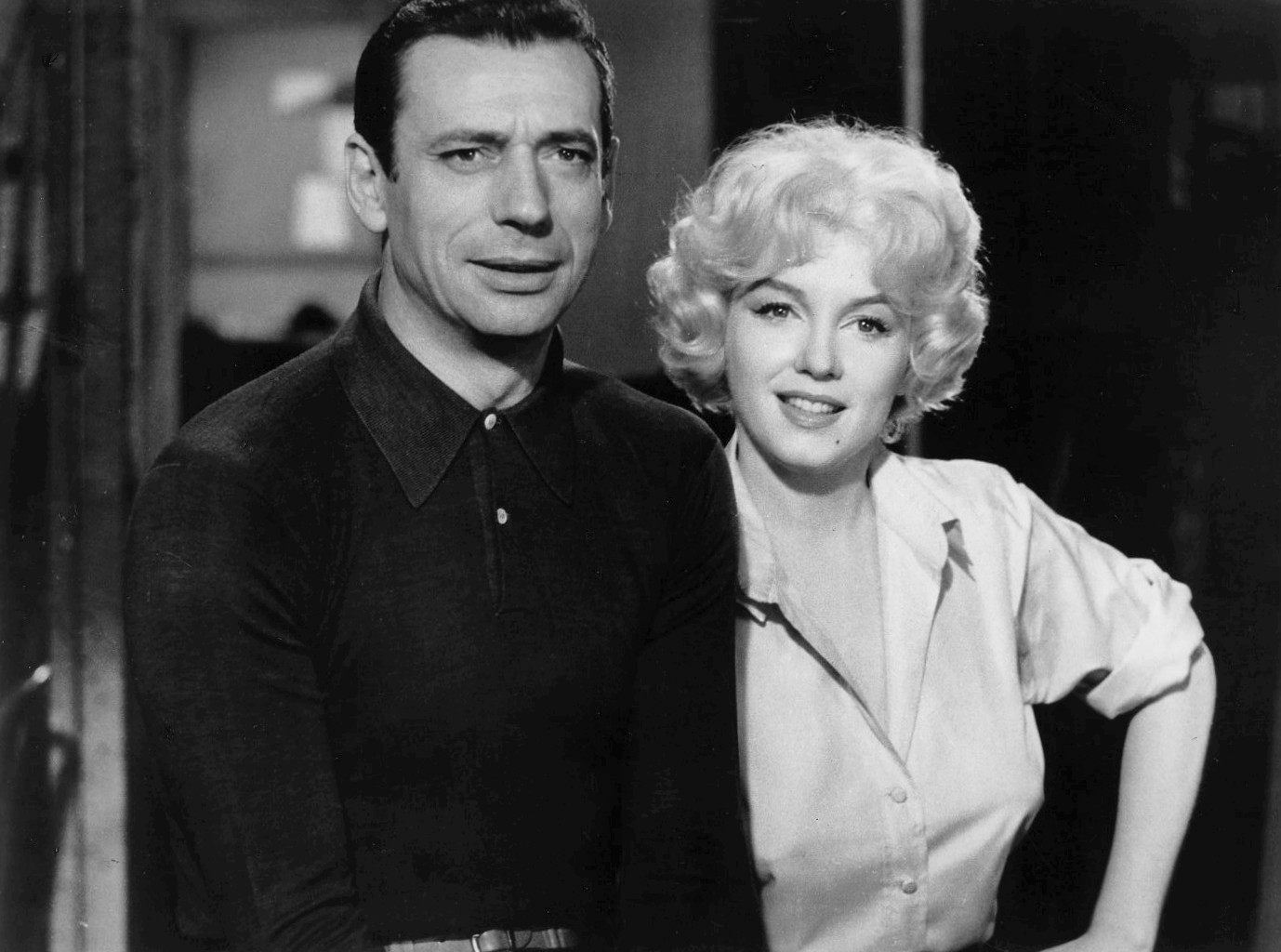
Montand and Monroe in a scene from the film. It was alleged that they had a brief affair during filming, and this led to greater publicity for the film.

- Marilyn Monroe as Amanda Dell
- Yves Montand as Jean-Marc Clément
- Tony Randall as Alexander Kaufman
- Frankie Vaughan as Tony Danton
- Wilfrid Hyde-White as Welch
- David Burns as Oliver Burton
- Milton Berle as Himself
- Bing Crosby as Himself
- Gene Kelly as Himself
- Joe Besser as Charlie Lamont
- Richard Haydn as narrator (uncredited)

== Background ==
In 1955, Monroe had entered into a new contract with 20th Century Fox, requiring her to star in four films within the next seven years. By 1959, she had completed only one: Bus Stop, released in 1956. While Monroe shot Some Like It Hot in 1958 (for United Artists) her then-husband, playwright Arthur Miller, completed the screenplay for The Misfits (1961), which they had intended to be Monroe's next film. Some Like It Hot was released in March 1959 and became an enormous success. Critics praised the film and Monroe's performance. Hoping to capitalize on this, 20th Century Fox insisted that Monroe fulfill her contract. The Misfits was put on hold and Monroe signed on to star in what was then titled The Billionaire.

The original script was written by Academy Award-winning screenwriter Norman Krasna. He was inspired to write the script after seeing Burt Lancaster do a dance at a Writers Guild Award ceremony and receive loud applause. He came up with the idea of a story about a very wealthy playboy like John Hay Whitney who hears about a company putting on a show that made fun of him and becomes enamored of the theater and a woman in the play. Krasna felt that only three actors were suitable – Gary Cooper, James Stewart and Gregory Peck – because all were so obviously not musical performers, making it funny if they sang and danced.

Peck agreed to play the lead, and then Monroe was signed opposite him, even though Krasna preferred Cyd Charisse. "I was thinking of a musical comedy star like Cyd Charisse—who’s kind of a lady, great legs. You would believe those two together, Gregory Peck and Cyd Charisse. There’s a class to it. But Monroe’s so darling, who can say she isn’t an asset?"

With Monroe attached to the picture, she and Miller wanted the part of Amanda expanded, and Miller worked on the script (although he did not receive credit) to achieve this. Peck bowed out after the emphasis shifted to the female lead. Various sources state that the role was then offered to Rock Hudson, Cary Grant, and Charlton Heston, all of whom declined. Hudson revealed in an interview that he was interested in the role but was denied permission by Universal-International Pictures, with which he was under exclusive contract. It was eventually offered to Yves Montand, who had appeared in a French film version of Miller's The Crucible (1957) and had received praise for his recent one-man musical show in New York. Monroe and Miller both gave their approval for Montand in the role. The title was changed to Let's Make Love and production began in January 1960 with George Cukor directing.

The outline of the plot was formed by rewriting the roles of the characters of the plot of the 1937 American musical film On the Avenue. The writing of the premise was also influenced by the 1959 film Pillow Talk.

In March 1960, Monroe was awarded the Golden Globe Award for Best Actress – Musical or Comedy, further cementing the success of Some Like It Hot. Montand's wife Simone Signoret, with whom he had starred in the French version of The Crucible, won the Academy Award for Best Actress for her role in Room at the Top in April. The two couples were soon inseparable; they had adjoining bungalows at the Beverly Hills Hotel.

== Production ==
From the beginning issues arose with the film. Monroe, although enthusiastic about Montand, did not want to make the film and the original screenwriter had reservations about the cast. Despite being offered the role and having found success with his one-man show, Montand did not speak English. This led to enormous stress as he worked to understand the lines he was speaking through translation. Monroe, at this point in her career, had developed a reputation for oftentimes being late to set, forgetting her lines, and deferring to her coach over the director. But according to Monroe's biographer, Donald Spoto, this was not true during the filming of Let's Make Love, although she and Cukor did not have the best relationship. Neither star was satisfied with the script and production was shut down for over a month by two Hollywood strikes: first by the Screen Actors Guild and then the Writers Guild of America.

Monroe and Montand were said to have bonded over the difficulties each was experiencing with the film, and when both Miller and Signoret departed during production for other commitments rumors about an affair between the two were rampant. Gossip columns at the time made note of frequent sightings of the two together alone. This led to greater publicity for the film, with Fox manipulating the affair to its advantage. In August 1960, shortly before the release of the film, Monroe and Montand were featured on the cover of Life magazine in a sensual pose taken from the film. Their affair ended when filming ended, with Montand returning to France.

== Release ==
=== Box office performance ===
Given the box office popularity of Monroe, and the press surrounding Montand and their relationship at the time, the film was considered to be a disappointment, although it was, in truth, a moderate success. The high expectations and modest results have led to many viewing the film as either a total flop or a huge success. It opened at the top of the box office its first weekend, but made only $6.54 million in total It was the first film starring Monroe to earn so little money on its initial release, although it was the top-grossing musical of the year and one of only two musicals in the top 20 in 1960. It fared better in overseas markets than in the United States.

=== Reception ===
Appraisals at the time were mixed. The New York Times reviewer wrote that the film was slow going, that Monroe looked "untidy", that throughout the film she is "fumbling with things in the sidelines", and that Montand's accent was so heavy it was not charming, just hard to understand. The direction and script were criticized for not allowing Montand the opportunity to use his Gallic humor. The irony of having Bing Crosby and Gene Kelly brought in to give the pupil further lessons was noted. The direction was further criticized because Monroe's appearance had changed very noticeably during the halt in production and under Cukor the differences had been exacerbated by poor costume, hair and makeup decisions, and by poor direction of the musical numbers. Poor editing was blamed for parts of the film seeming disjointed and for the use of stand-ins being easily noticed. It was reported that Fox executives wanted some of the scenes completely refilmed, but Cukor ignored such requests.

Variety stated that the film "has taken something not too original (the Cinderella theme) and dressed it up like new. Monroe is a delight...Yves Montand...gives a sock performance, full of heart and humour." The highlight of the film according to The New York Times was Milton Berle, who stole the show.

Review aggregation website Rotten Tomatoes gives the film an approval rating of 60% based on 15 critics.

Krasna said "it’s a very well-mounted picture of its kind. But, the gimmick that started it (genius is the word I mean when I say gimmick—gimmick is not a word to be sneered at) is Lancaster trying to sing, Lancaster getting all those laughs by dancing so lousy. The casting ruined it."

=== Accolades and aftermath ===
Let's Make Love received a nomination for Academy Award for Best Original Score for Lionel Newman and Earle H. Hagen and two BAFTA nominations for Best Film from any Source for George Cukor and for Best Foreign Actor (Montand). It also received a Golden Globe nomination for Best Picture Musical.

Not long before she died in 1962, Monroe commented that the role of Amanda was the worst in her career. In her opinion, there was "no role...that you had to wrack your brain...there was nothing there with the writing" and that it had "been part of an old contract." Arthur Miller was also critical of the film, stating that despite his efforts to improve the script it was "like putting plaster on a peg leg." During an interview with David Letterman in 1988, Montand acknowledged his difficulties with the script and his problem speaking English, but said it was an honor to work alongside Monroe.

== Songs ==
- "Let's Make Love" (Sammy Cahn and Jimmy Van Heusen) – sung by Marilyn Monroe and chorus, then by Monroe with Frankie Vaughan and again with Montand.
- "My Heart Belongs to Daddy" (Cole Porter) – sung by Monroe
- "Give Me the Simple Life" (Rube Bloom and Harry Ruby) – (parody) sung by Frankie Vaughan
- "Crazy Eyes" (Cahn and Van Heusen) – sung by Frankie Vaughan
- "Specialization" (Cahn and Van Heusen) – sung by Monroe and Frankie Vaughan
- "Incurably Romantic" (Cahn and Van Heusen) – sung by Bing Crosby and Montand, by Monroe and Montand and again by Monroe and Frankie Vaughan.

== In popular culture ==
In the 1992 film Cool World, Kim Basinger performed impressions of Monroe with Frank Sinatra Jr. singing the title song of the original film.

== Novelization ==
In advance of the film's release (as was the custom of the era), a paperback novelization of the screenplay was published in 1960 by Bantam Books, by-lined by Matthew Andrews, which seems to have been a pseudonym.

== See also ==
- List of American films of 1960
