= The Fontane Sisters =

US musical trio

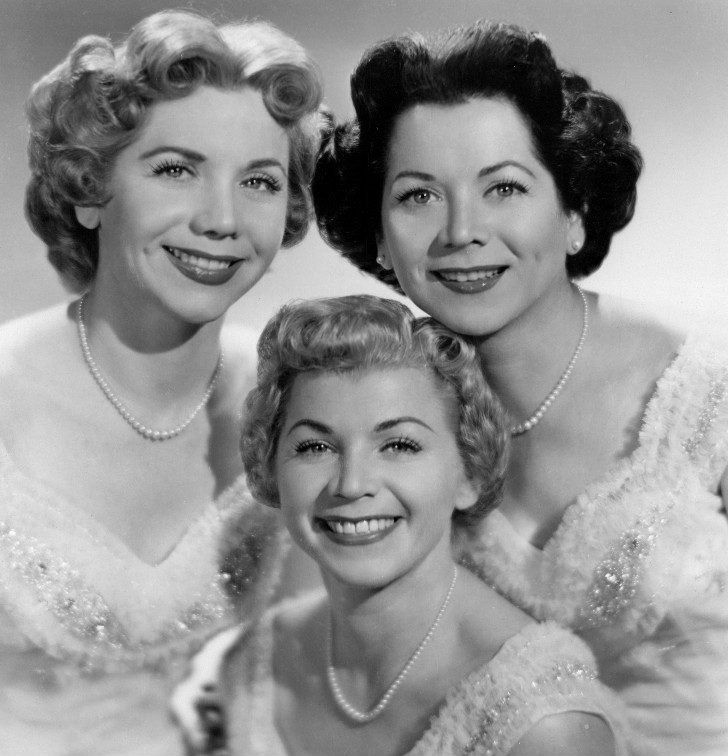
- The Fontane Sisters; Geri (left), Marge (center), Bea (right)

Background information
- Born: Geri: October 15, 1921; Bea: December 12, 1915; Marge: October 19, 1917
- Origin: New Milford, New Jersey, United States
- Died: Geri: September 13, 1993 (aged 71); Bea: March 25, 2002 (aged 86); Marge: December 3, 2003 (aged 86)
- Years active: 1941–1961
- Past members: Bea Rosse (December 12, 1915–March 25, 2002); Marge Rosse (October 19, 1917–December 3, 2003); Geri Rosse (October 15, 1921–September 13, 1993); Frank Rosse (1914–1945)

The Fontane Sisters were a close-harmony vocal trio (Bea, Geri and Marge Rosse) from New Milford, New Jersey.

== Early years ==
Born to an Italian family, their mother, Louise Rosse, was both a soloist and the leader of the St. Joseph's Church choir in New Milford. Bea and Marge started out singing for local functions, doing so well that they were urged to audition in New York City. Originally they performed as a trio with their guitarist brother Frank, under the name the Ross Trio (Rosse with the "e" omitted). The group auditioned for NBC and was soon sent off to work in Cleveland.

When they returned to New York in 1944, Frank was drafted into the Army; he went to France and was mortally wounded by a German sniper. Geri, who had just finished school, took her brother's place, making it an all-girl trio.

The sisters first performed together as The Three Sisters. Sheet music of two of their songs, "I'm Gonna See My Baby", and "Pretty Kitty Blue Eyes", was published by Santly-Joy in 1944.

== Success ==
The now all-female group chose the name of Fontaine from a French-Canadian great-grandmother. They cut two singles for Musicraft Records in 1946, and then worked on sustaining (non-sponsored) programs for NBC, meeting and working with Perry Como soon after he came to the network. Word reached the sisters, then in Chicago for NBC, that "Supper Club" would be making cast changes; they were eager for a chance to join Como's show, which also meant being closer to their home. Beginning in the summer of 1948, they were featured on his radio and TV show known as The Chesterfield Supper Club and later (1950–1954) as The Perry Como Show. The trio also did appearances on Chesterfield Sound Off Time when the program originated from New York; however, the television show lasted only one season.

In 1949 they were signed by RCA Victor and dropped the I from "Fontaine." There they cut a few dozen singles over the next several years, sometimes as backup to Perry Como. These songs were in the typical slow, sedate pop style of the period. In 1951, they had a minor hit with "The Tennessee Waltz", of which bigger selling recordings were made by Patti Page and Les Paul and Mary Ford.

In 1954 they switched to Randy Wood's Dot Records, where they abandoned the slow late 1940s-early 1950s style for faster material aimed at the growing teen/rock-and-roll audience, and they had 18 songs reaching the Billboard pop charts, including ten in the Top 40. Their late 1954 recording, "Hearts of Stone", was the highest charting single of their career; it sold over one million copies, and was awarded a gold disc.

== Retirement ==
The Fontane Sisters released their last significant hit when "Chanson D'Amour" went to No. 12 in 1958, and they retired from performing around 1961, when youngest sister Geri was expecting her daughter. The daughter was named after Geri, and as an adult she went by the name 'Geri Fontane Latchford' — 'Latchford' coming from her father's name, Al(bert) Latchford. Neither Bea nor Marge had any children, and the younger Geri was her parents' only child.

With the rise of rock-and-roll in the mid-1950s, most older performers were quickly sidelined. The sisters were tired of touring and disliked the direction popular music was headed, and were ready to cede the charts to the younger generation. Geri married Al Latchford, a history professor. Marge was married to Franklin Hobbs, who became a long-time on-air personality at WCCO in Minneapolis-St. Paul. They met while the sisters were still working in Chicago for NBC. She remarried and became Marge Smith, the wife of an advertising executive. Only Marge left the area, relocating to Florida with her second husband. Bea became Mrs. E. Holmes Douglass in 1964.

In 1963, Dot Records released one final album, Tips of my Fingers, and single ("Tips of My Fingers" / "Summertime Love") by The Fontane Sisters. These recordings did not mark a return to performing for the trio, who remained retired despite having agreed to make the recordings.

== Deaths ==
For the next 40 years, The Fontane Sisters remained mostly out of the public's eye. In 2001, RCA Records released a CD compilation of recordings made by the Fontane Sisters and Perry Como, "Perry Como With The Fontane Sisters", containing many of the songs featured on the Como radio and television shows.

In 2004 an article in the New York Daily News reported that Geri Fontane Latchford had received royalties due to her mother and two aunts. It was revealed in this same article that all three of The Fontane Sisters had died: Geri, on September 13, 1993; Bea, on March 25, 2002; and Marge, on December 3, 2003.

== Hit records ==
Year	Single	Chart positions
Year	Single	^{U.S.}
1949	"N'yot N'yow" (with Perry Como)	20
1949	"A You're Adorable" (with Perry Como)	1
1949	"A Dreamer's Holiday" (with Perry Como)	3
1949	"I Wanna Go Home" (with Perry Como)	18
1950	"Bibbidi Bobbidi Boo" (with Perry Como)	14
1950	"Hoop Dee Doo" (with Perry Como)	1
1950	"I Cross My Fingers" (with Perry Como)	25
1950	"You're Just In Love" (with Perry Como)	5
1951	"Tennessee Waltz"	20
1951	"Let Me In"	24
1951	"There's No Boat Like A Rowboat" (with Perry Como)	20
1951	"Castle Rock"	27
1951	"Rollin' Stone" (with Perry Como)	24
1951	"Cold Cold Heart"	16
1952	"Noodlin' Rag" (with Perry Como)	23
1952	"My Love and Devotion" (with Perry Como)	22
1952	"To Know You (Is To Love You)" (with Perry Como)	19
1954	"Kissin' Bridge"	22
1954	"Happy Days and Lonely Nights"	18
1954	"Hearts Of Stone"	1
1955	"Rock Love"	13
1955	"Rollin' Stone"	13
1955	"Playmates"	flip
1955	"Seventeen"	3
1955	"Daddy-O"	11
1955	"Adorable"	71
1955	"Nuttin' for Christmas"	36
1956	"Eddie My Love"	11
1956	"I'm In Love Again"	38
1956	"Voices"(with Pat Boone)	47
1956	"Lonesome Lover Blues"	93
1956	"Please Don't Leave Me"	55
1956	"Still"	86
1956	"The Banana Boat Song"	13
1957	"I'm Stickin' With You"	72
1958	"Chanson D'Amour"	12
1958	"Jealous Heart"	94

== Singles ==
- "Missouri Waltz/Linger In My Arms a Little Longer" (1946, Musicraft)
- "It Couldn't Be True (or Could It)/My Fickle Eye" (1946, Musicraft)
- "Hurry! Hurry! Hurry!" (w. The Three Suns) (1949, RCA Victor)
- "The Bumpety Bus" (1949, RCA Victor)
- "Fairy Tales/The Cinderella Work Song" (1950, RCA Victor)
- "Can't We Talk It Over" (1950, RCA Victor)
- "I Wanna Be Loved/I Didn't Know What Time It Was" (1950, RCA Victor)
- "Jing-A-Ling, Jing-A-Ling/Silver Bells" (1950, RCA Victor)
- "Tennessee Waltz" (1950, RCA Victor) (bigger hits by Patti Page and Les Paul and Mary Ford)
- "If I Knew You Were Comin' I'd've Baked a Cake" (1951, RCA Victor)
- "Grasshopper Heart (And a Butterfly Brain)/Handsome Stranger" (1951, RCA Victor)
- "A Howdy Doody Christmas/The Popcorn Song" (1951, RCA Victor)
- "Moon, June, Spoon" (1951, RCA Victor)
- "Grand Central Station/Alabama Jubilee" (1951, RCA Victor)
- "Castle Rock/Makin' Like a Train" (1951, RCA Victor)
- "The Fortune Teller Song/The Fifth Wheel on the Wagon (1951, RCA Victor)
- "I Get The Blues When It Rains/Cold, Cold Heart" (1951, RCA Victor)
- "Let Me In/Hurry Home to Me" (1951, RCA Victor)
- "River in the Moonlight/Snowflakes (1951, RCA Victor)
- "Kissing Bridge" (1953, RCA Victor)
- "Happy Days and Lonely Nights" (1954, this and all subsequent releases on Dot)
- "Willow Weep For Me" (1954)
- "Hearts Of Stone" (1954) (their biggest hit, originally recorded by Johnny Torrence and The Jewels; also covered by The Charms)
- "Rock Love" (1955) (originally recorded by Lula Reed; also covered by Eddie Fontaine)
- "Most of All (1955) (originally recorded by The Moonglows; also covered by Don Cornell)
- "Rollin' Stone" (1955), (originally recorded by The Marigolds)
- "Playmates" (1955) (originally recorded by Kay Kyser in 1940)
- "Seventeen" (1955) (originally recorded by Boyd Bennett)
- "Daddy-O" (1955) (originally recorded by "Mary Kath" known as Bonnie Lou)
- "Adorable" (originally recorded by The Colts; a bigger hit by The Drifters) (1955)
- "Nuttin' For Christmas" (1955) (also recorded by Art Mooney, Barry Gordon and Stan Freberg the same year)
- "Eddie My Love" (1956) (originally recorded by The Teen Queens; also covered by The Chordettes)
- "I'm in Love Again" (1956), (originally recorded by Fats Domino)
- "Lonesome Lover Blues" (1956) (originally recorded Billy Eckstine in 1946)
- "Doin' The Rock and Rolla" (1956) (a rewording of the Andrews Sisters, Rum & Coca-Cola)
- "(Remember Me) I'm the One Who Loves You" (1956) – (Remake of the Stuart Hamblen c/w hit)
- "Please Don't Leave Me" (1956), (originally recorded by Fats Domino)
- "Still" (1956), (originally recorded by Lavern Baker)
- "Voices" (1956)
- "With a Little Bit of Luck (1957)" (a bigger hit for Harry Belafonte and The Tarriers)
- "The Banana Boat Song (1957)" (originally recorded by The Tarriers)
- "I'm Stickin' with You" (1957) (originally recorded by Jimmy Bowen in 1957.
- "Jealous Heart" (1958) (originally recorded by Tex Ritter in 1945)
- "Chanson D'Amour" (1958) (bigger hit for Art and Dotty Todd)
- "Listen To Your Heart/Please Be Kind" (1959)
- "Darling, It's Wonderful/Theme From A Summer Place" (1959)
- "(Doin' The) Lovers' Leap/Come Home Eddie" (1960)
- "Tips of My Fingers"/"Summertime Love" (1963)

== Albums ==
- The Fontane Sisters/Novelty Orchestra and Organ - Fontaine Sisters And Orchestra (1955)
- The Fontane's Sing (1955)
- A Visit With The Fontane Sisters (1957)
- Tips of My Fingers (1963)
