= Gerri Hall =

American R&B singer (born 1934)

- Born: Erdine Bouise; August 2, 1934 (age 92); New Orleans, Louisiana, U.S.
- Genres: R&B, Blues
- Occupations: Singer
- Instruments: Vocals
- Years active: 1957–1981
- Labels: Rex Records, Ace Records, Atco Records, Hotline Records, RAI Records

Gerri Hall (born August 2, 1934) is an American R&B singer known for her works with Huey "Piano" Smith and the Clowns.

== Life and career ==
Gerri Hall was born Erdine Bouise in New Orleans, Louisiana. An African, Spanish, and American Indian descent, Hall was a fan of comedian Jerry Lewis from whom she named herself after. Her surname Hall comes from her ex-husband, who was the brother of Rosemary Hall Domino, the wife of Fats Domino.

Hall was working as a waitress at the club Dew Drop Inn where she met Huey Smith and Bobby Marchan. They invited her to join the Clowns in 1957. From then on, Hall served as one of the key members of the golden days of the Clowns singing on songs including "Don't You Just Know It". She also recorded with Huey Smith under the duo name of "Huey and Jerry".

Apart from her work with Smith, Hall took part in Earl King’s Imperial Records session doing backing vocals on two tracks "Don't You Lose It" and "Don't Cry My Friend" in 1962. These songs were released under its subsidiary label Post as a single. Hall also did some live dates with Benny Spellman and Smiley Lewis in New Orleans.

As a solo artist, she released some singles in the 1950s to 1960s, and in 1966, she appeared on the TV show The !!!! Beat, hosted by Hoss Allen. The single "I Cried a Tear" from the RAI label she released in 1966 was leased to Atco Records for a wider distribution.

Later, she gave up her solo career and joined Ray Charles' Raelettes.

She performed as a member of the Clowns at the Tipitina's in May, 1981, the show that is considered the last Clowns live appearance. Apparently, she has not been performing much if any after this show, but she has appeared as a panelist for the conference sessions at Ponderosa Stomp in New Orleans in 2010 and 2011.

== Discography ==
=== Singles ===
Year	Title	Label
1958	"Little Chickie Wah Wah" b/w "I Think You're Jiving Me" credited to Huey & Jerry	Vin 1000
1959	"I Love You" b/w "Toy Man"	Rex 1006
1962	"I'm The One" b/w "Hello Mister Dream"	Ace 646
1963	"Mr. Blues (Found A Home With Me)" b/w "I Cried A Tear"	RAI 133-741
1966	"Who Can I Run To" b/w "I Lost The Key"	Hot Line 905

=== Compilation albums ===
Year	Title	Label
1998	The First Take Is The Deepest Contains two previously unreleased Ace recordings "What I Learned About You", and "It's Not As Easy As That"	Westside WESA 811
