= The Garden of Eden (song) =

1956 song

Single by Joe Valino
- B-side: "Caravan"
- Released: September 1956
- Length: 2:40
- Label: Vik
- Songwriter: Dennise Norwood

"The Garden of Eden" is a song written and composed by Dennise Haas Norwood, and first recorded by Joe Valino, which reached Number 12 on the Billboard chart in December 1956. The song was also recorded by other artists, including Frankie Vaughan whose version gave him his first number one in the UK in 1957.

== Recording ==
Valino recorded the song at his second session for Vik Records, a subsidiary of RCA, backed by George Siravo and His Orchestra. "I knew it would be a hit, even as I was recording it," he told Wayne Jancik in The Billboard Book of One-Hit Wonders.

The song was released with "Caravan" as its flip side in September 1956.

== Charts ==
Chart (1956–1957)	Peak position
Australia (AMR)	3
UK Singles (Official Charts)	23
US Billboard The Top 100	12
US Cash Box Top 50	15

== Other versions ==
"The Garden of Eden"

Single by Frankie Vaughan
- B-side: "Priscilla"
- Length: 2:35
- Label: Philips
- Songwriter: Dennise Norwood
- Producer: Johnny Franz

In the UK, many different versions of the song were released. The most popular of these was recorded by the singer Frankie Vaughan with Wally Stott and His Orchestra and Chorus. The song gave Vaughan his first number-one hit in the United Kingdom in January 1957. The song entered the UK Singles Chart on 11 January 1957, and reached number one two weeks later. It spent four weeks at the top and 13 weeks in the charts all together.

Gary Miller released his version in the UK around the same time, and it reached No. 14 on the chart. Dick James released a version in 1957, reaching No. 18 in the UK chart.
