= Huey "Piano" Smith =

American R&B pianist (1934–2023)

- Born: Huey Pierce Smith; January 26, 1934; New Orleans, Louisiana, U.S.
- Died: February 13, 2023 (aged 89) Baton Rouge, Louisiana, U.S.
- Genres: Rock and roll; R&B
- Occupations: Pianist; songwriter; bandleader
- Years active: 1949–1981
- Labels: Savoy; Ace; Imperial; Pitter Pat; Instant; Cotillion; Charly

Huey Pierce "Piano" Smith (January 26, 1934 – February 13, 2023) was an American R&B pianist and session musician whose sound was influential in the development of rock and roll.

His piano playing incorporated the boogie-woogie styles of Pete Johnson, Meade Lux Lewis, and Albert Ammons, the jazz style of Jelly Roll Morton and the R&B style of Fats Domino. Steve Huey of AllMusic noted that "At the peak of his game, Smith epitomized New Orleans R&B at its most infectious and rollicking, as showcased on his classic signature tune, "Rockin' Pneumonia and the Boogie Woogie Flu".

== Career ==
=== Early years ===
Smith was born in the Central City neighborhood of New Orleans. He was influenced by the innovative work of Professor Longhair. He became known for his shuffling right-handed break on the piano that influenced other Southern players.

Smith wrote his first song "Robertson Street Boogie", named after the street where he lived, on the piano, when he was eight years old. He performed the tune with a friend Percy Anderson, with the two billing themselves as Slick and Doc. Smith attended Walter L. Cohen High School in New Orleans.

When Smith was 15, he began working in clubs and recording with his flamboyant partner, Eddie Jones, who rose to fame as Guitar Slim. When Smith was eighteen, in 1952, he signed a recording contract with Savoy Records, which released his first known single, "You Made Me Cry". In 1953 Smith recorded with Earl King.

In 1955, Smith became the piano player with Little Richard's first band in sessions for Specialty Records. The same year he also played piano on several studio sessions for other artists, such as Lloyd Price. Two of the sessions resulted in hits for Earl King ("Those Lonely Lonely Nights") and Smiley Lewis ("I Hear You Knocking").

In 1956, Smith recorded for Ace Records' with his Rhythm Aces. The A-side of the record was "Little Liza Jane", backed with "Everybody's Whalin'". On the session, in addition to Smith on piano, were sax man Lee Allen, Earl King on guitar, and Earl Palmer on drums. The Rhythm Aces consisted of vocalists Dave Dixon, Roland Cook, and Issacher "Izzycoo" Gordon. Mac Rebennack, also known as Dr. John, said, "And Huey was catching the real second line on 'Little Liza Jane'. Of course he had the right cats doing it, but he had that instinct for getting it. And with Dave Dixon and Izzycoo (Gordon) singing on it, man, he couldn't get no better." Gordon, who also sang with another notable New Orleans vocal group The Spiders, recorded Smith's Latin-tinged "Blow Wind Blow" under the name "Junior" Gordon in 1956.

=== With the Clowns at Ace Records ===
In 1957, he formed a band, Huey "Piano" Smith and His Clowns, with sometime vocalist Bobby Marchan, and signed a long-term contract with Ace Records, represented by former Specialty record producer Johnny Vincent. Smith and the Clowns recorded "Rockin' Pneumonia and the Boogie Woogie Flu" with singers Sidney Rayfield (Huey's barber) and eighteen-year-old "Scarface" John Williams joining him on vocals. Not caring for the sound of his own voice, Huey instructed Williams to move closer to the microphone. "Get in closer, John," he said. "I'm trying to get a hit out of this." The record was issued as "Rockin' Pneumonia and the Boogie Woogie Flu Part 1" on the A-side and "Rockin' Pneumonia and the Boogie Woogie Flu Part 2" (an instrumental) on the flip side by Ace Records' John Vincent. The record sold over one million copies, achieving gold disc status. Huey "Piano" Smith and His Clowns hit the Billboard charts with several follow-up singles in succession.

It was John 'Scarface' Williams who contributed the trademark "Mardi Gras" sound to Huey Smith's records. He was a member of the Apache Hunters, a Mardi Gras Indian tribe. He sang lead on "Genevieve", "Tu-Ber-Cu-Lucas And The Sinus Blues", "Beatnik Blues", and "Quit My Job", and contributed vocals to "Don't You Just Know It", "Pop-Eye", "Just A Lonely Clown", and others. Williams left the Clowns in 1959 and formed the Tick Tocks. New Orleans musician Aaron Neville said "I was close with Scarface when we were teens. He sang with Huey 'Piano' Smith and the Clowns in the early 1950s and then with the Tick Tocks—significant R&B groups in New Orleans. Scarface and I hung out a lot at the Dew Drop Inn on LaSalle Street. One night in March 1972, he was stabbed trying to stop a fight in front of a club on Dryades Street. His death was a big blow, not only because he was a well-known musician but also because he was the Big Chief of the Mo Hawk (sic) Hunters and a friend of our uncle, Big Chief Jolly, who was chief of his Mardi Gras Indian tribe." Art Neville added, "My three brothers and I were all singers and musicians, but we didn't officially come together as a group until 1976, when we sang back-up harmony on 'The Wild Tchoupitoulas'—my Uncle Jolly's album. It was named after his tribe and featured Mardi Gras Indian call-and-response chants. Members of the New Orleans band the Meters were on there, and it was co-produced by Allen Toussaint. That's the first time we recorded Cyril's "Brother John." "In the case of "Brother John", Cyril Neville noted, "I wrote the lyrics in the early '70s with my Uncle Jolly [George Landry]. They're set to a song with an African rhythm that was popular with every Mardi Gras Indian tribe then. James "Sugar Boy" Crawford was first to popularize this rhythm on his 1954 hit "Jock-a-mo." I wrote "Brother John's" lyrics with my uncle as a tribute to a friend—John 'Scarface' Williams—who had been killed a short time earlier."

In 1958, Vin Records, a subsidiary of Ace Records, released a popular single, "Little Chickee Wah Wah", with Clowns singer Gerri Hall, under the billing of Huey and Jerry. (This song is sometimes confused with the similarly titled 1956 single "Chickie Wah Wah", by Bobby Marchan, which has entirely different lyrics, tempo, chord structure and melody; the Vincent-Smith composition is built around the melody of the old black children's play song "Little Sally Walker.")

Meanwhile, Ace Records released several more singles by Huey "Piano" Smith and His Clowns, including "We Like Birdland", "Well I'll Be John Brown", and "Don't You Know Yockomo" (a cover version of which, recorded by the New Zealand artist Dinah Lee, reached number 1 in both New Zealand and Australia in 1964).

The Clowns' most famous single, released in 1958, was "Don't You Just Know It" backed with "High Blood Pressure." This hit number 9 on the Billboard Pop chart and number 4 on the Rhythm and Blues chart. It was their second million seller.

In late 1958, Ace Records removed Smith's vocal track from the original recording of his song "Sea Cruise" and replaced it with a vocal track by singer Frankie Ford. The song was Ford's first hit, selling over a million copies. Ace's decision to release the song with the Ford vocal and to not release Smith's original version meant that Smith was unable to fully benefit from his own work, and the move by Ace is considered by music historians to be an example of racial injustice in the 1950s pop-music industry. (Smith's original version of the song was eventually released.)

Smith left Ace Records for Imperial Records, to record with Fats Domino's noted producer (and fellow Louisianan) Dave Bartholomew, but the national hits did not follow. Instead, Ace Records again overdubbed new vocals by Curley Moore, Gerri Hall and Billy Brooks on another one of Smith's unreleased tracks, to produce "Pop-Eye", the last hit single credited to Smith. Moore also had minor regional solo hits under his own name, including "Soul Train", on Hot Line Records; and "Get Low Down" and "Don't Pity Me" on Sansu Records.

=== Post-Ace years ===
In the years following, Smith made several comebacks, performing as Huey "Piano" Smith and His Clowns, the Hueys, the Pitter Pats, and Shindig Smith and the Soul Shakers, but he never attained his former degree of success. A new recording of “Rocking Pneumonia” – featuring original vocalist "Scarface" John Williams – appeared on Atlantic Records subsidiary label Cotillion, number 45-44142, in 1971. It had been recorded along with remakes "High Blood Pressure", "Don’t You Just Know It", and "We Like Mambo" in 1970. Williams by this time had become a chief of the Apache Hunters Mardi Gras Indian tribe, and "We Like Mambo" contained Indian references.

=== Later years ===
Smith made a new recording with a band named Skor in 1977 at Sea-Saint Studios in New Orleans. This recording was released as the album, Rockin' & Jivin' by the British record label, Charly Records, in 1981. This album was the final studio recording by Smith.

In 1979, Smith along with the re-formed version of the Clowns made his debut at the New Orleans Jazz and Heritage Festival. The members included Bobby Marchan, Gerri Hall, Roosevelt Wright, and Curley Moore.

Huey "Piano" Smith and the Clowns also appeared at Tipitina's in New Orleans and New Orleans Jazz and Heritage Festival in 1981, but they did not perform after these two shows.

On December 17, 1985, Curley Moore was found murdered in Algiers neighborhood of New Orleans, Louisiana. He was 42 years old.

In 2000, Smith was honored with a Pioneer Award by the Rhythm and Blues Foundation. In his acceptance speech he said, "Actually you might not believe it, but this is a debut for me. It was Huey Smith and the Clowns, men like Curley Moore, Bobby Marchan, Roosevelt Wright, and John Williams." When the Louisiana Blues Hall of Fame honored Smith a year later, he said humbly that the honor mainly belonged to the Clowns. "I had the group the Pitter Pats and also the Hueys, but, now, very important is the members of the Clowns ---- Bobby Marchan, Curley Moore, John 'Scarface' Williams, and Gerri Hall".

Smith died at his home in Baton Rouge, Louisiana, on February 13, 2023, aged 89.

Steve Huey of AllMusic noted that "At the peak of his game, Smith epitomized New Orleans R&B at its most infectious and rollicking, as showcased on his classic signature tune, "Rockin' Pneumonia and the Boogie Woogie Flu".

== Discography ==
=== Singles ===
- "Little Liza Jane" / "Everybody's Wailin'" (Ace 521, 9/56)
- "Rockin' Pneumonia and the Boogie Woogie Flu, Parts 1 & 2" (Ace 530, 6/57)
- "Just A Lonely Clown" / "Free, Single And Disengaged" (Ace 538, 10/57)
- "Don't You Just Know It" / "High Blood Pressure" (Ace 545, 3/58)
- "Havin' A Good Time" / "We Like Birdland" (Ace 548, 5/58)
- "Little Chickee Wah Wah' / "I Think You Jiving Me" with Gerri Hall (Vin 1000, ?/58)
- "Don't You Know Yockomo" / "Well I'll Be John Brown" (Ace 553, 11/58)
- "Genevieve" / "Would You Believe It (I Have A Cold)" (Ace 562, 5/59)
- "Dearest Darling (You're The One)" / "Tu-Ber-Cu-Lucas And The Sinus Blues" (Ace 571, 9/59)
- "Beatnik Blues" / "For Cryin' Out Loud" (Ace 584, 3/60)
- "I Didn't Do It" / "They Kept On" (Vin 1024, 10/60)
- "The Little Moron" / "Someone To Love" (Imperial 5721, 1/61)
- "Behind The Wheel, Parts 1 & 2" (Imperial 5747, 4/61)
- "More Girls" / "Sassy Sara" (Imperial 5772, 8/61)
- "Snag-A-Tooth Jeannie" / "Don't Knock It" (Imperial 5789, 11/61)
- "She Got Low Down" / "Mean, Mean Man" (Ace 638, 11/61)
- "Pop-Eye" / "Scald-Dog" (Ace 649, 1/62)
- "Talk To Me Baby" / "If It Ain't One Thing It's Another" (Ace 8002, 10/62)
- "He's Back Again" / "Quiet As It's Kept" (Constellation 102, 9/63)
- "At The Mardi Gras" / "Second Line" with Curley Moore (Ace 671, ?/64)
- "Every Once In A While" / "Somebody Told It" (Ace 672, 12/64)

=== Albums ===
- Having a Good Time with Huey 'Piano' Smith and His Clowns (Ace 1004, 1960)
- Huey Smith and His Clowns: For Dancing (Ace 1015, 1962)
- 'Twas the Night Before Christmas (Ace 1027, 1962)
- Huey 'Piano' Smith's Rock & Roll Revival! (Ace 2021, 1971)
- Good Ole Rock 'N' Roll (Ace 2038, 1990)
- Snag-A-Tooth Jeannie: Rare and Unreissued Recordings 1960–1964 (Night Train International 7078, 1996)

=== As composer ===
- "Sea Cruise" – Frankie Ford (1959)
