= Boyd Bennett =

American singer-songwriter (1924–2002)

- Born: Boyd Byron Bennett; December 7, 1924; Muscle Shoals, Alabama, United States
- Died: June 2, 2002 (aged 77) Sarasota, Florida
- Genres: Rockabilly, Christian pop
- Occupations: Singer, songwriter
- Instruments: Vocals, Drums
- Years active: 1950s, 1980s
- Labels: King, Mercury, Rainbow
- Formerly of: Boyd Bennett And His Rockets

Boyd Byron Bennett (December 7, 1924 – June 2, 2002) was an American rockabilly songwriter and singer.

His two biggest hit singles, both written with John F Young and performed by him (Boyd) were "Seventeen" with his band, the Rockets (U.S. No. 5), (U.S. R&B No. 7), as well as No. 16 on the UK Singles Chart.; and "My Boy, Flat Top" (U.S. No. 39). He later became a disc jockey in Kentucky. He also worked with Francis Craig and Moon Mullican.

Bennett was inducted into the Rockabilly Hall of Fame for his contribution to the genre.

== Life and career ==
Bennett was born in Muscle Shoals, Alabama, United States, but attended high school in Tennessee and formed his first band there. He grew up in North Davidson, Tennessee, just outside Nashville. His family was musically oriented and talented. His grandfather taught members of churches within the community how to read music. He also taught Boyd by the age of four years how to read the notes in music, before Boyd could actually read song lyrics. Growing up during the Great Depression, Bennett did anything he could to make money. He sang in quartets and played guitar and sang outside of bars for extra funds. At the age of 16, however, his career was interrupted by World War II in which he served for four years; and in his free time perfected his playing of the guitar. During the early 1950s, Boyd Bennett and his Southlanders performed at local dances and on variety TV shows.

In 1952, while working at WAVE (TV), Boyd came up with the idea of a musical variety show called Boyd Bennett and His Space Buddies. For Foster Brooks, this was his first break in show business. The show was a take-off of the Gene Autry Show. Instead of singing cowboys, it was singing space cadets. The humor, music, and originality made the show a hit with local fans. The owner of the station was not so farsighted and the show was canceled after seven episodes. The next couple of years they performed at numerous dances and shows in the Kentucky, Indiana, and Ohio area.

Boyd and his group played in the Rustic Ballroom in Jasper, Indiana on a regular basis for a number of years. Renamed as Boyd Bennett and His Rockets, they came to the attention of Syd Nathan, owner of King Records. They released a couple of country tracks, "Time" and "Hopeless Case". Nathan then signed Bennett to a recording contract. Bennett's Rockets became King's house band, backing up Moon Mullican, Earl Bostic, Bill Doggett, Merle Travis, and Otis Williams and the Charms.

Bennett's live appearances made him conscious of the teenage audience, and he began to emphasize songs that would appeal to teenagers. The band played for both musical and comic effect, with 425-pound trumpeter Jim Muzey (billed as "Big Moe"), 110-pound guitarist M. D. Allen, bassist Kenny Cobb, and saxophonist Boots Randolph. Vocals rotated between Bennett, Muzey and, later, Elvis Presley-influenced Cecil McNabb Jr.

Bennett experimented with rhythm-heavy arrangements, and rented the King Records studio to record "Poison Ivy" (not the similarly titled hit recorded by The Coasters), "You Upset Me Baby", and "Boogie at Midnight". When sales topped 100,000 copies, the singles were then re-released under King Records.

In 1955, Boyd Bennett and His Rockets recorded "Seventeen". (King Records 45-1470) Bennett aimed the song directly at the teenage audience, but producer Syd Nathan dismissed the effort and claimed that teenagers had no money to buy records. Bennett shrewdly waited until Nathan left for a two-week vacation, and prevailed upon Nathan's assistant Henry Glover to release the record.

It reached the Billboard chart on July 9, 1955, and went to the number five by September. Boyd and the Rockets traveled across the nation. There were also several cover versions recorded that extended the release of the song. These included fellow chart efforts by The Fontane Sisters, Rusty Draper, and Ella Mae Morse. The Boyd Bennett disc of "Seventeen" "changed record-producing/buying and marketing forever," wrote musicologist Robert Reynolds: "As Boyd Bennett had predicted, teenagers bought 'Seventeen' in droves and other record companies soon began producing songs aimed specifically at the teen market. The record hung around the Top Ten for five weeks. When all was said and done, [Bennett's] 'Seventeen' had sold three million copies."

Boyd Bennett and his band followed "Seventeen" with "My Boy Flat Top" (almost identical, melodically) which reached the Top 40 for a number of months, although a lesser seller than their earlier effort. Boyd also worked as a disc jockey in 1955 in Louisville, Kentucky. In March 1956, Boyd's group released their cover version of "Blue Suede Shoes".

In 1959, Bennett left King Records and commenced a subsequent brief recording career with Mercury. Noting that he was drifting away from a teenage audience, he left the music industry and built up his business interests, which included owning nightclubs and an air-conditioning parts manufacturer. In the 1970s and 1980s, Bennett had health issues with both lymphoma and pulmonary fibrosis. He retired in Dallas, although he made infrequent concert appearances, often with Ray Price. He also recorded for Dallas-based Christian record label Rainbow, including the 1980s album "Step Into The Sunshine".

Bennett died of a lung ailment in Sarasota, Florida on June 2, 2002. Shortly before his death he was inducted into the Rockabilly Hall of Fame.
