= Seventeen (Boyd Bennett song) =

"Seventeen" is a popular song, recorded by Boyd Bennett and His Rockets in 1955. It was composed by Bennett, John F. Young, Jr., and Chuck Gorman.

Three versions of the song charted in 1955 in the United States. The original version, recorded by Bennett's band with a vocal by Jim Muzey (the latter credited on the label as "Big Moe") on King Records 45-1470, reached No. 5 on the US Billboard chart. The Fontane Sisters made a close-harmony cover version, which did even better, reaching No. 3. Rusty Draper's version charted at No. 18. A fourth version was recorded in 1955 (as the "B" side of a single) by 1940s boogie-woogie singing star Ella Mae Morse, backed by Big Dave Cavanaugh's orchestra.

In the United Kingdom, Frankie Vaughan recorded a version of the song. It peaked at No. 18 in the UK Singles Chart in December 1955.

The Boyd Bennett disc of "Seventeen" "changed record-producing/buying and marketing forever," wrote musicologist Robert Reynolds: "As Boyd Bennett had predicted, teenagers bought 'Seventeen' in droves and other record companies soon began producing songs aimed specifically at the teen market. The record hung around the Top Ten for five weeks. When all was said and done, [Bennett's] 'Seventeen' had sold three million copies."
