= Ace Records (United States) =

American record label

- Parent company: Demon Music Group
- Founded: 1955
- Founder: Johnny Vincent
- Defunct: 1997

Ace Records was a record label that was started in August 1955 in Jackson, Mississippi, by Johnny Vincent, with Teem Records as its budget subsidiary.

== History ==
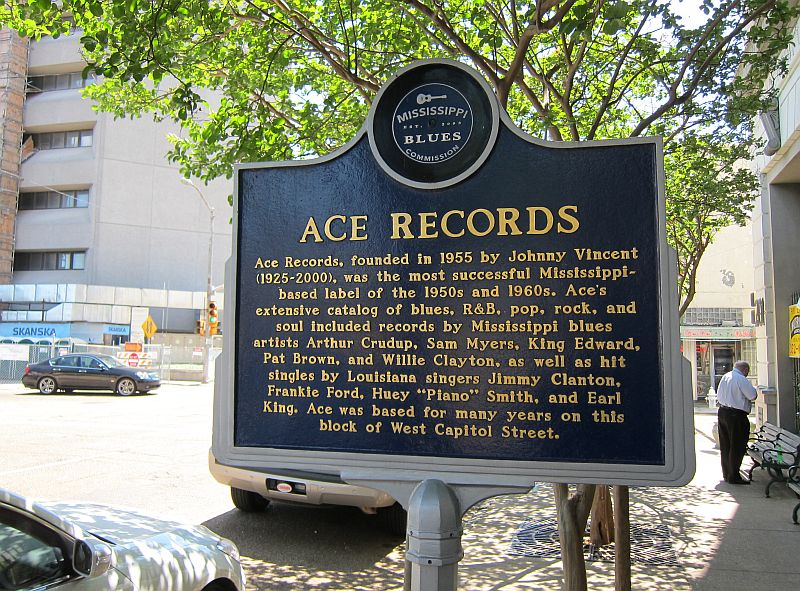
Ace Record's marker on the Mississippi Blues Trail

Ace also had the Vin label. Its records were distributed independently until 1962 when a distribution arrangement was set up with Vee-Jay Records. Ace Records stopped when Vee-Jay ran out of funds and went out of business. The label was relaunched in 1971 and sold in 1997 to the Demon Music Group in the UK.

Ace recorded such artists as Earl King, Frankie Ford, Jimmy Clanton, Huey "Piano" Smith, Joe Tex, Scotty McKay, and Bobby Marchan.

Ace Records received a marker on the Mississippi Blues Trail.

== Notable songs ==
- "Rockin' Pneumonia and the Boogie Woogie Flu" by Huey "Piano" Smith and The Clowns (1957)
- "Don't You Just Know It" by Huey "Piano" Smith and The Clowns (1958)
- "Just a Dream" by Jimmy Clanton (1958)
- "Sea Cruise" by Frankie Ford (1958)
- "Go, Jimmy, Go" by Jimmy Clanton (1959)
- "Gee Baby" by Joe and Ann (1959 - 1960)
- "Pop-Eye" by Huey "Piano" Smith and The Clowns (1962)
- "Venus in Blue Jeans" by Jimmy Clanton (1962)

== See also ==
- Ace Records (UK)
- List of record labels
- Ace Records artists with Wikipedia pages
- Category:Ace Records (United States) albums
