= Dayseeker discography =

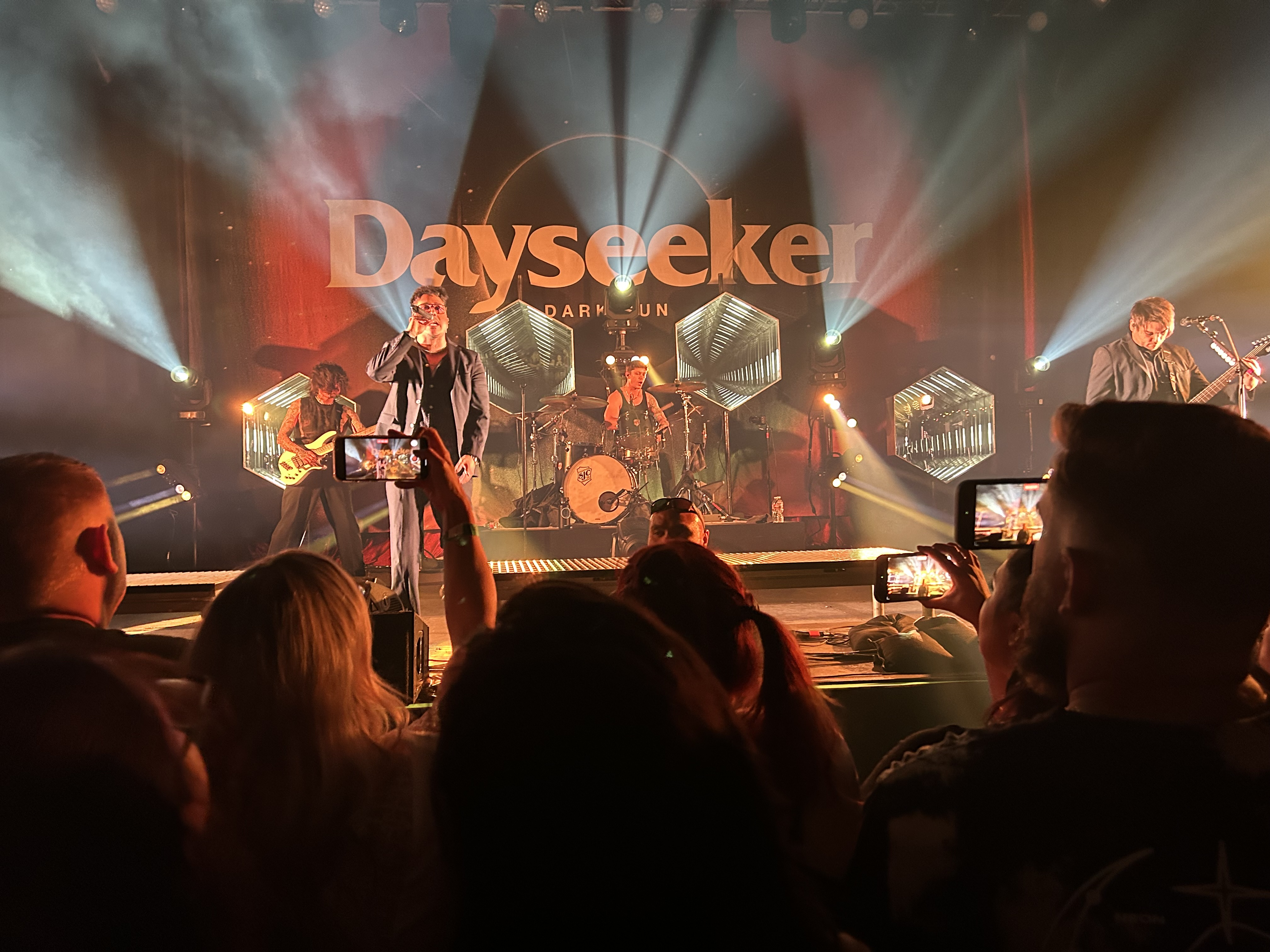
- Dayseeker in 2024
- Studio albums: 6
- Singles: 33
- Music videos: 15
- Re-recorded albums: 1

American post-hardcore band Dayseeker have released six studio albums, one acoustic re-recording, 33 singles, and 15 music videos.

== Studio albums ==
List of studio albums, with selected chart positions
Title	Album details	Peak chart positions							
Title	Album details	US	US Heat.	US Hard Rock	AUS	FRA Rock	SCO	UK Dig.	UK Rock
What It Means to Be Defeated	Released: October 29, 2013; Label: InVogue; Formats: CD, digital download	—	—	—	—	—	—	—	—
Origin	Released: April 21, 2015; Label: InVogue; Formats: CD, LP, digital download	—	20	—	—	—	—	—	—
Dreaming Is Sinking /// Waking Is Rising	Released: July 14, 2017; Label: Spinefarm; Formats: CD, digital download	—	11	—	—	—	—	—	—
Sleeptalk	Released: September 27, 2019; Label: Spinefarm; Formats: CD, LP, digital download	— (Note: "Sleeptalk" did not enter the US Billboard Hot 200, but peaked at number 86 on the US Top Album Sales chart.)	3	—	—	—	—	—	—
Dark Sun	Released: November 4, 2022; Label: Spinefarm; Formats: CD, LP, digital download	—	13	25	—	—	—	68	—
Creature in the Black Night	Released: October 24, 2025; Label: Spinefarm; Formats: CD, LP, digital download	79	×	4	43	80	89	20	8
"—" denotes a recording that did not chart or was not released in that territory. "×" denotes a chart did not exist at that time.

== Re-recorded albums ==
List of re-recorded albums
Title	Album details
Replica	Released: April 19, 2024; Label: Spinefarm; Formats: CD, LP, digital download

== Singles ==
=== As lead artist ===
List of singles as lead artist, with selected chart positions and certifications, showing year released and album name
Title	Year	Peak chart positions				Certifications	Album
Title	Year	US Rock Air.	US Hard Rock Digi.	US Hard Rock	US Main.	Certifications	Album
"Resurrect"	2012	—	—	—	—		What It Means to Be Defeated
"Collision.Survive"	2013	—	—	—	—		What It Means to Be Defeated
"What It Means to Be Defeated"	2013	—	—	—	—		What It Means to Be Defeated
"Origin"	2015	—	—	—	—		Origin (Dayseeker album)
"A Cancer Uncontained"	2015	—	—	—	—		Origin (Dayseeker album)
"The Earth Will Turn"	2015	—	—	—	—		Origin (Dayseeker album)
"Hurricane"	2016	—	—	—	—		Non-album single
"Vultures"	2017	—	—	—	—		Dreaming Is Sinking /// Waking Is Rising
"Sleep in the Sea – Pt. II" (featuring Garrett Russell of Silent Planet)	2017	—	—	—	—		Dreaming Is Sinking /// Waking Is Rising
"Six Feet Under" (reimagined)	2018	—	—	—	—		Dreaming Is Sinking /// Waking Is Rising (reimagined)
"Carved from Stone" (reimagined)	2018	—	—	—	—		Dreaming Is Sinking /// Waking Is Rising (reimagined)
"Crooked Soul"	2019	—	—	—	—		Sleeptalk
"Sleeptalk"	2019	—	—	—	—	RIAA: Gold	Sleeptalk
"Burial Plot"	2019	—	—	—	—		Sleeptalk
"Burial Plot" (reimagined)	2021	—	—	—	—		Sleeptalk (deluxe)
"Drunk" (reimagined)	2021	—	—	—	—		Sleeptalk (deluxe)
"Crooked Soul" (reimagined)	2021	—	—	—	—		Sleeptalk (deluxe)
"Neon Grave"	2022	—	—	—	—		Dark Sun
"Without Me"	2022	—	—	—	20		Dark Sun
"Dreamstate"	2022	—	—	—	23		Dark Sun
"Crying While You're Dancing"	2022	—	—	—	—		Dark Sun
"Burial Plot" (acoustic; featuring Caleb Shomo of Beartooth)	2024	—	—	—	—		Replica
"My Immortal" (acoustic; Evanescence cover)	2024	—	—	—	—		Replica
"Neon Grave" (acoustic)	2024	—	—	—	—		Replica
"Pale Moonlight"	2025	34	—	11	7		Creature in the Black Night
"Creature in the Black Night"	2025	—	—	19	—		Creature in the Black Night
"Shapeshift"	2025	—	—	23	23		Creature in the Black Night
"Bloodlust"	2025	—	9	22	—		Creature in the Black Night
"Crawl Back to My Coffin"	2025	14	—	8	1		Creature in the Black Night
"Shapeshift" (The Midnight remix)	2026	—	—	—	—		Creature in the Black Night Redux
"—" denotes a recording that did not chart or was not released in that territory.

=== As featured artist ===
List of singles as featured artist, showing year released and album name
Title	Year	Peak chart positions		Album
Title	Year	US Hard Rock	US Main.	Album
"Fuck, I'm Lonely" (Bilmuri featuring Dayseeker)	2020	—	—	Muri and Friends
"Color Blind" (Adventure Club and Nurko featuring Dayseeker)	2021	—	—	Love // Chaos
"Medicate Me" (Rain City Drive featuring Dayseeker)	2024	17	32	Things Are Different Now
"I Want to Believe (In This Moment featuring Dayseeker)	2026	21	11	Witch
"One by One" (We Came as Romans featuring Dayseeker)	2026	—	—	All Is Beautiful... Because We're Doomed: Circularity
"—" denotes a recording that did not chart or was not released in that territory.

== Music videos ==
List of music videos, showing year released and directors names
Title	Year	Album	Director	Ref.
"What It Means to Be Defeated"	2012	What It Means to Be Defeated	Michael Elinn	
"Vultures"	2017	Dreaming Is Sinking /// Waking Is Rising	Orie McGuinness	
"Abandon"	2017	Dreaming Is Sinking /// Waking Is Rising	Kevin Johnson	
"Sleep in the Sea – Pt. II"	2017	Dreaming Is Sinking /// Waking Is Rising	Orie McGuinness	
"Sleeptalk"	2019	Sleeptalk	Kevin Johnson	
"Neon Grave"	2022	Dark Sun	Orie McGinness	
"Without Me"	2022	Dark Sun	Shaun Hodson	
"Crying While You're Dancing"	2022	Dark Sun	Orie McGinness	
"Homesick"	2023	Dark Sun	Orie McGinness	
"Dreamstate"	2024	Dark Sun	Orie McGinness	
"My Immortal (Acoustic)"	2024	Replica	Amber Paredes	
"Neon Grave (Acoustic)"	2024	Replica	Amber Paredes	
"Pale Moonlight"	2025	Creature in the Black Night	Jensen Noen	
"Creature In the Black Night"	2025	Creature in the Black Night	Orie McGinness	
"Crawl Back to My Coffin"	2025	Creature in the Black Night	Jensen Noen	
"I Want to Believe"	2026	Witch	Michael Lombardi	
