= Syndicate (album) =

2025 studio album by The Midnight

Studio album by The Midnight
- Released: October 3, 2025; May 15, 2026 (Deluxe)
- Recorded: 2023–2025
- Studios: Honeymoon Suite (Los Angeles); Gatos Trails (Yucca Valley); The Secret Lair (Atlanta); Varsity Blue Studios (Los Angeles); Penny's Palace (Los Angeles); Hawkes Studios (North Hollywood)
- Genre: Synthwave
- Length: 85:07
- Label: Ultra
- Producer: Tim McEwan

The Midnight chronology
| Heroes (2022) | Syndicate (2025) |

Singles from Syndicate
- 1. "Chariot" Released: September 6, 2024; 2. "Love Is an Ocean" Released: February 21, 2025; 3. "Digital Dreams" Released: May 30, 2025; 4. "Shadowverse" Released: August 1, 2025; 5. "Summer's Ending Soon" Released: August 29, 2025; 6. "Runaways" Released: September 17, 2025

Syndicate (Deluxe)
- Deluxe edition cover

Singles from Syndicate (Deluxe)
- 1. "Love Is an Ocean (Chromeo Remix)" Released: April 24, 2026

Syndicate is the sixth studio album by synthwave band The Midnight. The album was released through Ultra Records on October 3, 2025. Tim McEwan and Tyler Lyle co-wrote all of the songs on the album with Tim also handling production.

Six singles were released ahead of the album's debut; "Chariot", "Love Is an Ocean", "Digital Dreams", "Shadowverse", "Summer's Ending Soon", and "Runaways" featuring Bonnie McKee. The Midnight have promoted the album with their Fall 2025 EU/UK supporting tour and 2026 Time Machines tour. A deluxe edition of the album released on May 15, 2026 featuring six additional songs including unreleased demos and remixes such as their latest single "Love Is an Ocean (Chromeo Remix)".

== Background ==
The Midnight made their Ultra Records debut with the single, "Chariot" in September 2024. The band followed with their second single, "Love is an Ocean" in February 2025. Third single "Digital Dreams" released on May 30, 2025. "Chariot" was featured on the soundtrack for the Codemasters racing video game F1 25 which also released the same day.

Fourth single "Shadowverse" released on August 1 along with the reveal of Syndicate's tracklist and October 3, 2025 release date. Fifth single "Summer's Ending Soon" released on August 29. Sixth single "Runaways" featuring Bonnie McKee released on September 17.

During the first show of their Fall 2025 EU/UK tour, The Midnight live debuted five tracks from the album including performances of three of the singles.

In an interview with Daily Express, McEwan called Syndicate "our version of an apocalypse record" which had gone through a rework after the band and label mutually agreed the first version wasn't there yet. Lyle called Syndicate "the album that we just couldn't help ourselves from making" with both Lyle and McEwan going through personal trauma during the writing process. Lyle calls the album the denouement of the Kids / Monsters / Heroes trilogy, signaling the closing of a chapter.

The Midnight announced a deluxe version of Syndicate with six additional songs was releasing on May 15, 2026. The expanded album features new songs, unreleased demos, and remixes including their latest single "Love Is an Ocean (Chromeo Remix)".

== Composition ==
Musically, the album has been described as synthwave and retrofuture. Nicholas Senior of New Noise Magazine calls Syndicate "a darker record in sound and symbolism" due to personal trauma for the band, stating it "feels like them hitting the reset button after jumping around with labels and experimenting a bit over their past couple releases." Aaron Vehling of Vehlinggo said "this new album holds on dearly to some of the 1980s or retro nostalgia that’s always colored their compositions, but this is pretty clearly a release much more interested in the electronic and pop music of now and the future."

== Critical reception ==
Professional ratings
Review scores
| Source | Rating |
|---|---|
| Boolin Tunes | 7/10 |
| New Noise Magazine | 4.5/5 stars |
| Vehlinggo | – |

Joe Edwards of Boolin Tunes called Syndicate "a record crafted with letting those who enjoy The Midnight fully embrace their sound, and some more." Writing for New Noise Magazine, Nicholas Senior stated, "It’s the best The Midnight album in a long time and maybe ever." Aaron Vehling of Vehlinggo said "in true McEwan-Lyle fashion, they put everything into their art and so they still they ended up creating one of their best albums."

== Track listing ==
All tracks are written by Tim McEwan and Tyler Lyle, alongside additional writers, as noted.

Syndicate track listing
| No. | Title | Writer(s) | Length |
|---|---|---|---|
| 1. | "Syndicate" (Intro) | J3PO | 2:27 |
| 2. | "Shadowverse" | Ben Thompson; Dan the Automator | 4:56 |
| 3. | "Runaways" (featuring Bonnie McKee) | Bonnie McKee | 5:07 |
| 4. | "Friction" | Lelia Broussard; Royce Whittaker; Dan the Automator | 3:56 |
| 5. | "The Right Way" | Jonathan Capeci; Nicholas Sainato; Joseph Beretta | 4:52 |
| 6. | "Afterglow pt. 1" | | 5:28 |
| 7. | "Digital Dreams" | | 6:06 |
| 8. | "Sentinels" | Broussard | 4:59 |
| 9. | "Chariot" | Matt Baum | 4:25 |
| 10. | "First Night in Paris" (featuring Carpenter Brut) | Carpenter Brut | 2:57 |
| 11. | "Afterglow pt. 2" | | 4:11 |
| 12. | "Fatal Obsession" (featuring Jupiter Winter) | Broussard; Justin Klunk; Edward Gamper | 5:39 |
| 13. | "Quiet Earth" | | 5:49 |
| 14. | "Long Island" | Derek Mount; Riley Friesen | 5:08 |
| 15. | "Love Is an Ocean" | MNDR | 5:22 |
| 16. | "Sanctuary" | | 6:54 |
| 17. | "Summer's Ending Soon" | Broussard; Whittaker; Oliver McEwan | 6:51 |
| Total length: | | | 85:07 |

Deluxe edition
| No. | Title | Writer(s) | Length |
|---|---|---|---|
| 18. | "Love Is An Ocean (Chromeo Remix)" | MNDR | 3:27 |
| 19. | "Runaways (Driver405 Remix)" (featuring Bonnie McKee) | Bonnie McKee | 6:03 |
| 20. | "Last Night In Paris" (featuring Carpenter Brut) | Carpenter Brut | 2:57 |
| 21. | "Infinite" (Demo) | | 3:40 |
| 22. | "Against the Dark" (Demo) | | 3:38 |
| 23. | "'Til the Stars Come Out" (Demo) | | 4:00 |
| Total length: | | | 108:52 |

== Personnel ==
Credits adapted from the album's liner notes.

The Midnight

- Tyler Lyle – vocals
- Tim McEwan – production, mixing

Additional Personnel

- Lelia Broussard – vocals (12), backing vocals (5, 12, 14, 17)
- Thomas Edinger – saxophone (3)
- J3PO – synth pads (1)
- Justin Klunk – saxophone (3, 12)
- Oliver McEwan – synth bass (1), synths (17)
- Bonnie McKee – vocals (3)
- Jacob Scesney – saxophone (15)
- Royce Whittaker – guitar (4–5, 14, 17), synths (17), backing vocals (17)

Production

- Carpenter Brut – production (10), mixing (10)
- Kevin Grainger – mastering (7, 9, 15)
- Stephan Hawkes – guitar engineer (4), vocal engineer (5, 12, 14)
- Cass Irvine – mastering (1–6, 8, 10–14, 16–17)
- NEST Acoustics – additional production (1–8, 11, 13–14, 16–17)

Visuals

- Alex Hooker – album artwork
- Isiaiah "ZAY" Clayborne III – layout

Locations

- Recorded at Honeymoon Suite (Los Angeles, CA), Gatos Trails (Yucca Valley, CA), The Secret Lair (Atlanta, GA), Varsity Blue Studios (Los Angeles, CA), Penny's Palace (Los Angeles, CA), Hawkes Studios (North Hollywood, CA)

== Charts ==
Chart performance for Syndicate
| Chart (2025) | Peak position |
|---|---|
| Australian Albums (ARIA) | 90 |
| Scottish Albums (Official Charts) | 60 |
| Spanish Vinyl Albums (PROMUSICAE) | 56 |
| Swedish Physical Albums (Sverigetopplistan) | 15 |
| UK Albums Sales (OCC) | 23 |
| US Top Album Sales (Billboard) | 13 |
| US Top Dance Albums (Billboard) | 6 |
