= Drunk (disambiguation) =

Drunk means alcohol intoxication or a person suffering from it.

Drunk or Drunks may also refer to:

== Music ==
- Drunk (album), a 2017 album by Thundercat
- "Drunk" (Jimmy Liggins song), 1953
- "Drunk" (Ed Sheeran song), 2012
- "Drunk (And I Don't Wanna Go Home)" a song by Elle King and Miranda Lambert, 2021
- Drunk, an album by Vic Chesnutt, 1993
- "Drunk", a song by Kylie Minogue from Impossible Princess, 1997
- "Drunk", a song by Viola Beach from Viola Beach, 2016
- "Drunk", a song by Zayn from Mind of Mine, 2016
- "Drunk", a song by Schoolboy Q from Crash Talk, 2019
- "Drunk", a song by Dayseeker from Sleeptalk, 2019
- "Drunk", a song by Maggie Rogers from Don't Forget Me 2024
- "Drunk", a song by ¥$ featuring Peso Pluma on a deluxe version of Vultures 2, 2024

== Other uses ==
- Drunk, a main antagonist of Bubble Bobble
- Drunks (film), a 1995 film starring comedian Richard Lewis
- The Triumph of Bacchus, a 1628 painting by Diego Velázquez also referred to as The Drunks
- Drunk (book), a book by Edward Slingerland
- "Drunk" (Casualty), a 1986 television episode
- "Drunk" (Not Going Out), a 2012 television episode
