= Creature in the Black Night =

Studio album by Dayseeker
- Released: October 24, 2025; February 26, 2027 (Redux deluxe edition)
- Genres: Metalcore; post-hardcore; melodic metalcore
- Length: 39:18
- Label: Spinefarm
- Producer: Daniel Braunstein

Dayseeker chronology
Replica (2024)	Creature in the Black Night (2025)

Dayseeker studio album chronology
Dark Sun (2022)	Creature in the Black Night (2025)

Singles from Creature in the Black Night
- 1. "Pale Moonlight" Released: April 23, 2025; 2. "Creature in the Black Night" Released: July 9, 2025; 3. "Shapeshift" Released: August 22, 2025; 4. "Bloodlust" Released: September 25, 2025; 5. "Crawl Back to My Coffin" Released: October 22, 2025

Creature in the Black Night Redux
- Deluxe edition cover

Singles from Creature in the Black Night Redux
- 1. "Shapeshift (The Midnight remix)" Released: October 22, 2026

Professional ratings
Review scores
Source	Rating
AllMusic	4/5 stars
Blabbermouth	8.5/10
Kerrang!	4/5
New Noise Magazine	5/5 stars

Creature in the Black Night is the sixth studio album by the American post-hardcore band Dayseeker. The album was released on October 24, 2025, through Spinefarm Records and was produced by Daniel Braunstein. It was the band's final studio album to release before guitarist Gino Sgambelluri's departure from the band on November 6, 2025. A deluxe release of the album titled Creature in the Black Night Redux is scheduled to release on February 26, 2027.

== Background and release ==
In March 2025, the band announced that they had finished recording their sixth studio album. On April 23, the first single, "Pale Moonlight", was released. On July 9, the title of the album, Creature in the Black Night, was announced alongside the release date of October 24 and a single of the same name. On August 22, the band released the third single, "Shapeshift". On September 25, the fourth single, "Bloodlust", was released. On October 22, two days before the album's release, the band released the fifth and final single, titled "Crawl Back to My Coffin".

On March 16, 2026, the band teased a deluxe release of the album via their Instagram account. On October 22, the band released a remix of "Shapeshift" featuring The Midnight and announced the deluxe edition of the album, entitled Creature in the Black Night Redux, scheduled for release February 26, 2027.

== Composition ==
Creature in the Black Night has been described as metalcore, post-hardcore, and melodic metalcore, with elements of alternative rock.

== Track listing ==
All lyrics are written by Rory Rodriguez; all music is composed by Rory Rodriguez and Daniel Braunstein, with additional writers where noted.

No.	Title	Music	Length
1.	"Pale Moonlight"	Tyler Smith	3:40
2.	"Creature in the Black Night"	Cody Quistad	3:49
3.	"Crawl Back to My Coffin"		4:02
4.	"Shapeshift"	Mitchell Stark	4:07
5.	"Soulburn"		3:00
6.	"Bloodlust"		3:30
7.	"Cemetery Blues"		3:22
8.	"Nocturnal Remedy"		3:39
9.	"The Living Dead"		3:08
10.	"Meet the Reaper"		3:31
11.	"Forgotten Ghost"		3:30
Total length:			39:18

Redux deluxe edition tracks
No.	Title	Length
12.	"The Ghost of You" (My Chemical Romance cover)	3:30
13.	"Shapeshift" (The Midnight remix)	4:09
14.	"Pale Moonlight" (The Midnight remix)	4:49
15.	"Crawl Back to My Coffin" (The Midnight remix)	5:02
16.	"Bloodlust" (featuring Gabi Rose) (The Midnight remix)	3:52
17.	"The Living Dead" (featuring Sace6) (The Midnight remix)	4:09
18.	"Creature in the Black Night" (The Midnight remix)	4:45
19.	"Shapeshift" (Live on Sirius XM Octane)	4:16
20.	"Crawl Back to My Coffin" (Live on Sirius XM Octane)	4:47
Total length:		78:37

== Personnel ==
Credits adapted from the album's liner notes and Tidal.

=== Dayseeker ===
- Rory Rodriguez – lead vocals, guitar, bass, piano
- Ramone Valerio – bass
- Gino Sgambelluri – guitar
- Zac Mayfield – drums

=== Additional contributors ===
- Daniel Braunstein – recording, production, additional mixing
- Zakk Cervini – mixing, mastering
- Ryan Sanders – art direction, design
- Cody Quistad – guitar (2)
- Mitchell Stark – guitar (4)
- The Midnight – production, mastering, lead vocals (13–18)

== Charts ==
Chart performance for Creature in the Black Night
Chart (2025)	Peak position
US Billboard 200	79
Australian Albums (ARIA)	43
France Rock Albums (SNEP)	80
