= The Night God Slept =

Studio album by Silent Planet
- Released: November 10, 2014
- Recorded: 2014
- Genre: Metalcore; progressive metal; melodic metalcore
- Length: 32:43
- Label: Solid State
- Producer: Spencer Keene; Daniel Braunstein

Silent Planet chronology
Lastsleep (1944–1946) (2014)	The Night God Slept (2014)	Everything Was Sound (2016)

The Night God Slept is the debut studio album by American metalcore band Silent Planet. The album was released on November 10, 2014, through Solid State Records. It was co-produced by guitarist Spencer Keene and former Volumes' member Daniel Braunstein.

== Background and promotion ==
After the band released the EP Lastsleep (1944–1946) in January 2014, they set out to record their first studio album. While the songs "Tiny Hands (Au Revoir)", "Darkstrand (Hibakusha)" and "Wasteland (Vechnost)" had already been included in this EP, the other tracks were previously unreleased.

On May 17, 2014, the band announced the completion of the album. On July 13, band members also stated that the album is set to be released in fall 2014 through "an artist-friendly record label who is allowing [them] to retain full creative control."

On September 14, the band revealed the release date of the record to be November 10, 2014. On September 19, they dropped a hint pointing towards the name of the album on their Facebook page. On September 23, it was announced that the album would be released through Solid State Records. The group then released some new songs from the record to their Facebook page, starting with "XX (City Grave)" on September 30, followed by "Native Blood" on October 23, "Firstwake" on November 2 and "Depths II" on November 5.

== Composition ==
=== Themes ===
The lyrics tell different stories, mostly told through the eyes of woman protagonists, as explained by the band's vocalist Garrett Russell:

We see a lot of cultural misogyny in music, certainly in heavy music. Women in heavy music are caught in a binary – they are either written as a 'good' moral, ideal woman or a 'bad' sinful, tempting woman – but almost never written from their own perspective. What links all of the women in our songs is that they ultimately have to make difficult decisions under the systemic oppression of their coercive ruling forces. Forces which include government, authority figures and the society they live in.

- "XX (City Grave)" deals with the modern day crisis of sex trafficking in America.
- "Native Blood" speaks about the history of Native Americans, for example 1830's Indian Removal Act and 1887's Dawes Act.
- "Tiny Hands (Au Revoir)" is based on the story of Marguerite Rouffanche, survivor of the Oradour-sur-Glane massacre, an event that happened on June 10, 1944 during the Second World War.
- "Firstwake" discusses the contrast between the intentions of Christianity as opposed to the global perception of Christianity in America.
- "Darkstrand (Hibakusha)" tells the story of a mother and a child being ripped apart by a layer of rubble as the bombing of Hiroshima ensues. (Hibakusha (被爆者) is the Japanese term used to refer to the surviving victims of the Nagasaki and Hiroshima bombings.)
- "Wasteland (Vechnost)" deals with the morality of the Soviet Union's victory in contrast with having suffered more casualties than any other country during World War II and the Soviet Union's views on religion. (Вечность (vechnost) is the Russian word for eternity.)

== Critical reception ==
Professional ratings
Review scores
Source	Rating
Alternative Press	3.5/5 stars
HM	4.5/5 stars
Indie Vision Music	4/5 stars
Jesus Freak Hideout	4.5/5 stars 4/5 stars
Substream Magazine	4/5 stars

Awarding the album three and a half stars from Alternative Press, Dan Slessor writes, "these leanings grow perhaps a little too pronounced and the band's personality grows somewhat fuzzy, but when they are at their best they are gripping." Geoff Burns, giving the album four stars for Substream Magazine, states, "Throughout the aggressive breakdowns and double bass moments, the album is lyrically insightful." Rating the album four and a half stars at HM, Collin Simula describes, "It's musical, challenging, heavy and truly surprising."

Giving the album four and a half stars at Jesus Freak Hideout, Scott Fryberger says, "The Night God Slept is an excellent label debut". Michael Weaver, awarding the album four stars from Jesus Freak Hideout, writes, "The Night God Slept is a strong entry into this year's heavy music pool." Indicating in a four and a half star review for Jesus Freak Hideout, Dylan Minson states, "The Night God Slept is a really fun, frantic and intentional record". Brody Barbour, signaling in a four star review by Indie Vision Music, describes, "this album is phenomenal".

== Track listing ==
No.	Title	Length
1.	"The Well"	3:00
2.	"XX (City Grave)"	2:52
3.	"I Drowned in the Desert"	1:28
4.	"Native Blood"	3:53
5.	"Tiny Hands (Au Revoir)"	3:31
6.	"Firstwake"	4:14
7.	"Darkstrand (Hibakusha)"	3:17
8.	"First Mother (Lilith)"	2:35
9.	"To Thirst for the Sea"	1:06
10.	"Wasteland (Vechnost)"	3:29
11.	"Depths II"	3:13
Total length:		32:43

== Personnel ==
Credits adapted from AllMusic.

Silent Planet

- Garrett Russell – unclean vocals
- Spencer Keene – guitars, production, engineering, programming
- Igor Efimov – guitars
- Thomas Freckleton – guitars, bass, keyboards, clean vocals
- Alex Camarena – drums

Additional musicians

- Natalie Nicoles of Branches – guest vocals on track 5
- Joel Quartuccio of Being as an Ocean – guest vocals on track 6
- Sean McCulloch of Phinehas – guest vocals on track 7, artwork
- Rory Rodriguez of Dayseeker – guest vocals on track 8
- Nathan Mead of I, of Helix – guest vocals on track 10

Additional personnel

- Daniel Braunstein – production, engineering, mixing
- Will Putney – mastering
- Adam Skatula – A&R

== Charts ==
Chart (2014)	Peak position
US Christian Albums (Billboard)	24
US Top Hard Rock Albums (Billboard)	16
US Independent Albums (Billboard)	43
