= Heroes (The Midnight album) =

2022 studio album by the Midnight

Studio album by The Midnight
- Released: September 9, 2022
- Recorded: 2020–2022
- Genre: Synthwave
- Length: 56:47
- Label: Counter
- Producer: Tim McEwan

The Midnight chronology
Monsters (2020)	Heroes (2022)	Syndicate (2025)

Singles from Heroes
- 1. "Change Your Heart or Die" Released: April 14, 2022; 2. "Heartbeat" Released: June 8, 2022; 3. "Avalanche" Released: July 6, 2022; 4. "Brooklyn. Friday. Love" Released: August 3, 2022; 5. "Heart Worth Breaking" Released: August 24, 2022

Professional ratings
Review scores
Source	Rating
AllMusic	4/5 stars
Daily Express	5/5 stars
New Noise Magazine	4.5/5 stars

Heroes is the fifth studio album by synthwave band The Midnight. It was released on September 9, 2022, by Counter Records.

== Background ==
The album includes songs that are influenced by hair metal bands and heavy metal, specifically Def Leppard and Mutt Lange. The band confirmed the album was a follow-up to their 2020 album Monsters, which is also part of a trilogy of albums starting with their 2018 release Kids.

== Track listing ==
All tracks are written by Tim McEwan and Tyler Lyle, alongside additional writers, as noted.

No.	Title	Writer(s)	Length
1.	"Golden Gate"		6:04
2.	"Brooklyn. Friday. Love."	Nikki Flores	3:52
3.	"Heartbeat"	Flores; Royce Whittaker	3:50
4.	"A Place of Her Own"		5:33
5.	"Heroes"	Whittaker; Lelia Broussard	5:13
6.	"Heart Worth Breaking"		5:07
7.	"Loved by You"		3:44
8.	"Aerostar"	Whittaker	4:55
9.	"Change Your Heart or Die"		3:31
10.	"Avalanche"	Jessie Frye	4:27
11.	"Souvenir"	Whittaker	3:34
12.	"Photograph"		2:37
13.	"Energy Never Dies, It Just Transforms"		4:20
Total length:			56:47

== Personnel ==
Credits adapted from the album's liner notes.

The Midnight

- Tyler Lyle – vocals
- Tim McEwan – production, engineer

Production

- Ingmar Carlson – mixing
- Emily Lazar – mastering

Visuals

- Tension Division (Brandon Rike, Joel Cook, Nathaniel David Utesch) – creative direction and design
- Aaron Campbell – illustration

Locations

- Recorded in Atlanta, GA and Los Angeles, CA
- Mixed at The Gift Shop (Los Angeles, CA)
- Mastered at The Lodge (New York, NY)

== Charts ==
Chart performance for Heroes
Chart (2022)	Peak position
Australian Albums (ARIA)	66
UK Albums (Official Charts)	74
US Billboard 200	167
US Top Dance Albums (Billboard)	3
US Independent Albums (Billboard)	22
