= Tipsy =

Tipsy may refer to:

- Tipsy, an adjective describing a state of light alcohol intoxication
- Tipsy (aircraft), a series of light aircraft designed by Ernest Oscar Tips
- Tipsy (band), an American experimental lounge band

== Songs ==
- "Tipsy" (song), by J-Kwon, 2004
- "A Bar Song (Tipsy)", by Shaboozey, 2024
- "Tipsy", by Carmouflage Rose, 2021
- "Tipsy", by Chloe x Halle from the 2020 album Ungodly Hour
- "Tipsy", by Jake Owen from the 2013 album Days of Gold
- "Tipsy (In Dis Club)", by Pretty Ricky from the 2009 album Pretty Ricky
- "Tipsy", by T-Pain from the 2007 album Epiphany

== See also ==
- Drunk (disambiguation)
- Tipppsy, a 2024 Indian film by Deepak Tijori
