= When the End Began =

Studio album by Silent Planet
- Released: November 2, 2018
- Recorded: 2017–2018
- Studio: Graphic Nature Audio, Belleville, New Jersey, U.S.
- Genre: Metalcore; progressive metal; post-metal
- Length: 48:10
- Label: Solid State; UNFD
- Producer: Will Putney; Spencer Keene

Silent Planet chronology
Everything Was Sound (2016)	When the End Began (2018)	Iridescent (2021)

Singles from When the End Began
- 1. "Northern Fires (Guernica)" Released: June 15, 2018; 2. "Vanity of Sleep" Released: July 17, 2018; 3. "Share the Body" Released: August 17, 2018; 4. "In Absence" Released: September 14, 2018; 5. "The New Eternity" Released: October 19, 2018

When the End Began (stylized in Braille as ⠱⠢ ⠮ ⠢⠙ ⠆⠛⠁⠝) is the third studio album by American metalcore band Silent Planet. The album was released on November 2, 2018, through UNFD and Solid State Records. It was co-produced by Will Putney and Spencer Keene. This is the first album to feature Mitchell Stark as the only guitarist.

== Background and promotion ==
On June 15, 2018, the band released "Northern Fires (Guernica)", which revolves around the Spanish Civil War. On July 17, they unveiled another single titled "Vanity of Sleep", which revolves around modern consumer despair. On August 7, the band announced the album itself and the release date.

On August 17, the third single, "Share the Body", was available with a corresponding music video. On September 14, the group was streaming the fourth single "In Absence". On October 19, one month before the album release, the fifth and final single of the album ,"The New Eternity", came out. On August 18, 2019, the band released an additional song, "Shark Week", a B-side from this album's sessions.

== Critical reception ==
Professional ratings
Review scores
Source	Rating
Depth	10/10
Distorted Sound	8/10
HM	4.5/5 stars
New Noise	5/5 stars
Rock 'N' Load	9/10

Nao Lewandowski states, "When the End Began is nothing short of spectacular and fans would expect nothing less from the band that has forged such a unique path in the music industry."

Caleb Newton writes, "In short, their work on their newest record never falls flat or leaves holes." Ali Cooper describes, "Audibly inspired by the harsh realities of the world in 2018, When the End Began is a dominating and genuine interpretation of where metalcore should be now, on the SILENT PLANET."

Ed Ford says of the album, "every note, beat, lyric and vocal is thought through and blended with differing genres of Metal to create something individual and rather good." Kel Burch writes, "Atmospherically huge and creatively impressive, the album reinforces Silent Planet's lofty position of being a respected and innovative voice in metalcore."

== Track listing ==
All tracks are written by Silent Planet

No.	Title	Length
1.	"Thus Spoke"	2:14
2.	"The New Eternity"	3:25
3.	"Northern Fires (Guernica)"	3:54
4.	"Afterdusk"	3:55
5.	"Visible Unseen"	3:51
6.	"Look Outside: Dream"	1:30
7.	"Vanity of Sleep"	4:09
8.	"In Absence"	3:30
9.	"Share the Body"	3:33
10.	"Firstborn (Ya'aburnee)"	5:07
11.	"Lower Empire"	3:50
12.	"Look Inside: Awake"	1:36
13.	"The Anatomy of Time (Babel)"	3:43
14.	"Depths III"	3:46
Total length:		48:10

Notes

- All track titles are stylized in Braille.

== Personnel ==
Credits adapted from AllMusic.

Silent Planet

- Garrett Russell – unclean vocals
- Mitchell Stark – guitars, additional production
- Thomas Freckleton – bass, keyboards, clean vocals
- Alex Camarena – drums

Additional musicians

- Annalee Althouse and Caroline Garlick – violin on track 14, "Depths III"
- Blair Cunningham – viola on track 14, "Depths III"
- Lia Criscuolo – cello on track 14, "Depths III"

Additional personnel

- Will Putney – production, engineering, mixing, mastering, composition
- Spencer Keene – production
- Brandon Ebel – executive production
- Randy Slaugh – additional production, editing, string arrangements, string engineering
- Daniel Braunstein – additional production
- Steve Seid – engineering
- Chad Chen – editing on track 14, "Depths III"
- Matthew Guglielmo – assistance
- Kevin Johnson – multi-media
- Adam Skatula – A&R
- Ryan Sanders – art direction, design

== Charts ==
Chart (2018)	Peak position
US Billboard 200	97
US Christian Albums (Billboard)	3
US Top Hard Rock Albums (Billboard)	8
US Independent Albums (Billboard)	2
US Top Rock Albums (Billboard)	13
