= Monsters (The Midnight album) =

2020 studio album by the Midnight

Studio album by The Midnight
- Released: July 10, 2020
- Recorded: 2019–2020
- Genre: Synthwave
- Length: 57:56
- Label: Counter
- Producer: Tim McEwan

The Midnight chronology
Kids (2018)	Monsters (2020)	Heroes (2022)

Singles from Monsters
- 1. "America Online" Released: May 3, 2019; 2. "Deep Blue" Released: May 6, 2020; 3. "Dance with Somebody" Released: June 10, 2020; 4. "Prom Night" Released: June 24, 2020

Professional ratings
Review scores
Source	Rating
AllMusic	4/5 stars
Daily Express	4/5 stars
Exclaim!	8/10

Monsters is the fourth studio album by synthwave band The Midnight. It was released on July 10, 2020, by Counter Records. The album was included on AllMusic's list of the best albums of 2020.

== Background ==
The album deals with themes of romance, lost love and nostalgia within a backdrop of 1980s-style synthwave. In an interview with Icon vs Icon, the band confirmed that Monsters is a thematic continuation of their previous album Kids, focusing on adolescence, closeness and alienation from the perspective of a teenager. The band also confirmed that Kids and Monsters are part of a trilogy.

The cover artwork was made by artist Aaron Campbell, who also created the artwork for their previous album, Kids.

== Track listing ==
All tracks are written by Tim McEwan and Tyler Lyle, alongside additional writers, as noted.

No.	Title	Writer(s)	Length
1.	"1991" (Intro)		0:27
2.	"America Online"		5:49
3.	"Dance With Somebody"		4:17
4.	"Seventeen"		4:02
5.	"Dream Away"		3:39
6.	"The Search for Ecco"		4:04
7.	"Prom Night"		5:02
8.	"Fire In The Sky"	Collin McLoughlin	4:09
9.	"Monsters" (featuring Jupiter Winter)	Lelia Broussard	3:17
10.	"Helvetica"		5:16
11.	"Brooklyn"		4:14
12.	"Deep Blue"		3:57
13.	"Night Skies"		3:04
14.	"City Dreams" (Interlude)		2:17
15.	"Last Train"		4:22
Total length:			57:56

== Personnel ==
Credits adapted from the album's liner notes.

The Midnight

- Tyler Lyle – vocals
- Tim McEwan – production, mixing

Additional Personnel

- Daniel Davidsen – lead guitar (4)
- Thomas Edinger – saxophone (3)
- Izzy Fontaine – guitar (7, 11, 15)
- Oliver McEwan – synth bass (3), fretless bass (11)
- Jesse Molloy – saxophone (12)

Production

- Chris Allgood – mastering
- Emily Lazar – mastering

Visuals

- Aaron Campbell – album artwork, layout

Locations

- Recorded in Los Angeles, CA, Atlanta, GA, and the back of a tour bus all over the world.
- Mastered at The Lodge (New York, NY).

== Charts ==
Chart performance for Monsters
Chart (2020)	Peak position
Australian Albums (ARIA)	28
UK Albums (Official Charts)	85
US Billboard 200	134
US Top Dance Albums (Billboard)	3
US Independent Albums (Billboard)	18
