= Jimmy Liggins =

American R&B guitarist and bandleader (1918-1983)

Background information
- Birth name: James L. Elliott
- Also known as: James H. Liggins
- Born: October 14, 1918; Earlsboro, Oklahoma, United States
- Died: July 21, 1983 (aged 64); Durham, North Carolina, U.S.
- Genres: R&B, jump blues
- Occupation(s): Singer, guitarist, bandleader
- Instrument: Guitar
- Years active: 1946—1960s
- Labels: Specialty, Aladdin, others

Jimmy Liggins (born James L. Elliott; October 14, 1918 – July 21, 1983) was an American R&B guitarist and bandleader. His brother was the more commercially successful R&B/blues pianist, Joe Liggins.

== Career ==
The son of Harriett and Elijah Elliott, he was born in Newby, Oklahoma, United States, and adopted his stepfather's surname, Liggins, as a child. He moved with his family to San Diego, California in 1932, and graduated from Hoover High School. He fought under the name of Kid Zulu as a professional boxer until age 18, when he began as a driver for his brother Joe's band, the Honeydrippers.

Liggins started his own recording career as a singer, guitarist, and leader of the Drops of Joy, on Art Rupe's Specialty label in 1947. One of his early releases, "Cadillac Boogie" was a direct forerunner of "Rocket 88", itself often called the first rock and roll record. Recordings such as "Tear Drop Blues" (1948) and, later, "I Ain't Drunk" (1954), featuring leading saxophone players such as Maxwell Davis, made him one of the most successful bandleaders in the jump blues period of the late 1940s and early 1950s.

Liggins left Specialty in 1954, recording "I Ain't Drunk" (1954), later covered by Albert Collins, at Aladdin, before fading from the scene. He began his own management and record company Duplex Records in 1958. His wild stage presence and manic delivery influenced Little Richard, Chuck Berry, Bill Haley and Elvis Presley.

Liggins died in July 1983, at the age of 64, in Durham, North Carolina.

== Discography ==
=== Singles ===
==== Specialty records ====
- 520 – "I Can't Stop It" // "Troubles Good-Bye" (1947)
- 521 – "Cadillac Boogie" // "Tear Drop Blues" (1948)
- 525 – "Move Out Baby" // "Rough Weather Blues" (1948)
- 319 – "Careful Love" // "Homecoming Blues" (1948)
- 322 – "Baby! I Can't Forget You" // "Lookin' For My Baby" (1949)
- 339 – "Don't Put Me Down" // "Nite Life Boogie" (1949)
- 353 – "Misery Blues" // "Mississippi Boogie" (1950)
- 362 – "Answer To Tear Drop Blues" / "That Song Is Gone" (1950)
- 374 – "Saturday Nite Boogie Woogie Man" // "Sincere Lover's Blues" (1950)
- 380 – "I Want My Baby For Christmas" / "Shuffle-Shuck" (1950)
- 397 – "Down & Out Blues" / "Lonely Nights Blues" (1951)
- 406 – "Lover's Prayer" // "The Washboard Special" (1951)
- 418 – "That's What's Knockin' Me Out" // "Goin' Down with the Sun" (1951)
- 427 – "Low Down Blues" // "Stolen Love" (1952)
- 434 – "Dark Hour Blues" // "Brown Skin Baby" (1952)
- 470 – "Drunk" // "I'll Never Let You Go" (1953)
- 484 – "Going Away" // "Come Back Home" (1954)

==== Aladdin records ====
- 3250 – "I Ain't Drunk" // "Talkin' That Talk" (1954)
- 3251 – "Boogie Woogie King" // "No More Alcohol" (1954)

==== Duplex records ====
- 9010 – "Ada from Decatur" // "Knocked Out" (1960)
- 9014 – "Good Loving Baby" // "Working Man Blues" (1960)
- 1002 – "Blues for Love" // "Last Round" (1964)

=== LP/CD compilations ===
- Joe & Jimmy Liggins: Saturday Night Boogie Woogie Man (Sonet SNTF-5020 [LP], 1976) note: one side each from Jimmy and his brother Joe; all Specialty material.
- I Can't Stop It (Route 66 KIX-18 [LP], 1981)
- Jimmy Liggins & His Drops of Joy (Specialty SPCD-7005, 1990)
- Rough Weather Blues: Jimmy Liggins & His Drops of Joy, Vol. 2 (Specialty SPCD-7026, 1992)
- Jimmy Liggins Presents 'The Best of Duplex Records' (Bluebeat, 2014)
- Knocking You Out (A Singles Collection Featuring All The Hits 1947–1959) (Jasmine, 2016)
