= Origin (Dayseeker album) =

Studio album by Dayseeker
- Released: April 21, 2015
- Recorded: January–March 2015
- Studio: Capital House Studio, Galena, Ohio
- Genre: Post-hardcore; metalcore
- Length: 47:17
- Label: InVogue
- Producer: Nick Ingram

Dayseeker chronology
| What It Means to Be Defeated (2013) | Origin (2015) | Dreaming Is Sinking /// Waking Is Rising (2017) |

Singles from Origin
- 1. "Origin" Released: March 17, 2015; 2. "A Cancer Uncontained" Released: April 2, 2015; 3. "The Earth Will Turn" Released: April 15, 2015

Origin is the second studio album by the American post-hardcore band Dayseeker. The album was released on April 21, 2015, through InVogue Records and was produced by Nick Ingram.

== Background and recording ==
Alex Polk announced in mid-December 2014 that the band would fly to Ohio to record the new album with record producer Nick Ingram who worked with bands like Before Their Eyes and Hotel Books in the past.

The band recorded a cover song of "Jealous" originally released by Nick Jonas which fans were able to download when they pre-ordered the record at MerchNow.

The album's track list was leaked on April 2, 2015.

== Promotion and release ==
The first song the band released on March 26, 2015, was the title track "Origin". Another song was released by InVogue Records on YouTube on April 3, 2015, titled "A Cancer Uncontained". The latest single, "The Earth Will Turn" was released on April 15, 2015, just one week before the album's official release.

On April 18, 2015, the band headed out for a short U.S. tour with Silent Planet to promote their new record. The tour ended on May 4, 2015, in Indianapolis, Indiana after eleven shows.

== Critical reception ==
Professional ratings
Review scores
| Source | Rating |
|---|---|
| laut.de | 4/5 stars |
| Outspoken | (Positive) |
| Ultimate Guitar | 9.5/10 stars |

Origin received nearly exclusively positive reviews. The lyrical themes and the singing voice of vocalist Rory Rodriguez were praised by some reviewers.

== Commercial performance ==
Origin peaked at No. 1 at iTunes metal charts. The album sold exactly 1,150 copies during the first sales week, resulting Origin being the first charting album ever. It peaked on no. 20 at Billboard Heatseekers Charts in charting week of May 9, 2015.

== Track listing ==
| No. | Title | Length |
|---|---|---|
| 1. | "The Nail in Our Coffin" (featuring Dana Willax) | 3:39 |
| 2. | "A Cancer Uncontained" | 4:10 |
| 3. | "Dead to the World: Alive in My Eyes" | 3:28 |
| 4. | "The Earth Will Turn" | 4:42 |
| 5. | "The Darkness Won't Divide" | 1:19 |
| 6. | "Origin" | 4:30 |
| 7. | "The Burning of Bridges" | 4:05 |
| 8. | "Spotless Mind" | 4:24 |
| 9. | "The World Was Quiet" | 4:48 |
| 10. | "Lucid Dreamer" | 2:44 |
| 11. | "A God Without a Face" | 4:18 |
| 12. | "Never See the Sun Rise" | 5:10 |
| Total length: | | 47:17 |

Deluxe Edition bonus tracks
| No. | Title | Length |
|---|---|---|
| 13. | "A Cancer Uncontained" (reimagined) | 5:07 |
| 14. | "Spotless Mind" (reimagined) | 4:34 |
| 15. | "The Burning of Bridges" (reimagined) | 4:11 |
| 16. | "The World Was Quiet" (reimagined) | 5:28 |
| 17. | "The Earth Will Turn" (reimagined) | 4:58 |
| 18. | "Hello" (Adele cover) | 4:53 |
| 19. | "Jealous" (Nick Jonas cover) | 3:45 |
| Total length: | | 80:13 |

== Personnel ==
Dayseeker

- Rory Rodriguez – lead vocals
- Gino Scambelluri – lead guitar, backing vocals
- Alex Polk – rhythm guitar
- Andrew Sharp – bass
- Mike Karle – drums, percussion

Additional musicians

- Dana Willax – guest vocals on track 1

Additional personnel

- Nick Ingram – production, engineering, mixing, mastering
- Dayseeker – engineering
- Bailey Zindel – art direction, design
