= Iridescent (album) =

Studio album by Silent Planet
- Released: November 12, 2021
- Recorded: September 2019–March 2021
- Genre: Metalcore; progressive metalcore; post-rock
- Length: 39:52
- Label: Solid State; UNFD
- Producer: Drew Fulk; Daniel Braunstein; Mitchell Stark

Silent Planet chronology
When the End Began (2018)	Iridescent (2021)	Superbloom (2023)

Singles from Iridescent
- 1. "Trilogy" Released: February 14, 2020; 2. "Panopticon" Released: August 20, 2021; 3. "Terminal" Released: September 17, 2021; 4. "Anhedonia" Released: October 22, 2021

Iridescent is the fourth studio album by American metalcore band Silent Planet. The album was released on November 12, 2021, through UNFD and Solid State Records. It was co-produced by Drew Fulk, Daniel Braunstein and guitarist Mitchell Stark. It is the last album to feature the band's bassist and clean vocalist Thomas Freckleton before he left the band in June 2023 due to wanting to spend more time with his family and having a fusion in his spine which had only gotten more painful over the years. It is also the band's first album to feature clean vocals from Garrett Russell and Mitchell Stark (Freckleton was the sole clean vocalist on all prior albums), and the first to include explicit language.

== Background and promotion ==
On February 14, 2020, the band released "Trilogy", a single that focuses and revolves around vocalist Garrett Russell's stay in a mental hospital in which he wrote the lyrics in one sitting.

On March 23, 2021, band members officially announced the album was completed. On April 9, after unveiling some artworks the prior couple days, they announced during the global COVID-19 pandemic a surprise collaboration with Fit for a King. The collaboration included both bands' vocalists being featured on reworked version of their recent tracks and both bands will also release a limited merch line to promote the collaboration. On August 20, the group surprise released the single "Panopticon".

On September 17, the band officially unveiled the third single "Terminal" along with its music video. At the same time, the band revealed the album itself, the album cover, the track list, and release date. To promote the album, they also announced that they will support Motionless in White's rescheduled U.S. tour along with Light the Torch and Dying Wish which has started in May 2021. On October 22, one month before the album release, the group debuted the fourth single "Anhedonia".

== Critical reception ==
Professional ratings
Review scores
Source	Rating
Distorted Sound	9/10
New Noise	5/5 stars
New Transcendence	9/10
Wall of Sound	7.5/10

The album received generally positive reviews from critics. Distorted Sound scored the album 9 out of 10 and said: "SILENT PLANET continue to throw caution to the wind and construct fearless, creative offerings that can lift you up and break you down in equal measure. Iridescent takes you through a whirlwind of emotions and moods as it progresses, and the quality stands just as strong from beginning to end. The lyrical content deals with issues that are very prevalent in many lives and this will certainly resonate with the listener. Another top draw release from a top drawer band." New Noise gave the album perfect score 5 out of 5 and stated: "It's as if, echoing the thematic aspects, the band collectively dove deeper inside themselves to discover a version of Silent Planet that isn't hidden behind history or expectations. Silent Planet have always been placed in the shadows of the great forward-thinking Solid State artists that came before them (Underoath; Oh, Sleeper, As Cities Burn, etc.), but Iridescent feels like a personal statement of intent. This is who Silent Planet are, or at least, this is who this goofy writer is very pleased to hear the band presenting currently. Confident, energized, and personal, Iridescent is a stunning record, sure to be on many year-end lists."

New Transcendence gave the album 9 out of 10 and stated: "Iridescent is a vivid, colorful, haunting and powerful experience that effortlessly lives in the listener's mind and is impossible not to put on repeat." Wall of Sound gave the album a score 7.5/10 and saying: "Iridescent commences with mysterious sonics until Russell comes in with a faded verse on his half-clean-half-unclean vocals, packed with energy and emotion. The rest of Silent Planet kick in with the ultimate fusion of their ambient metalcore model and then sheer utter mathcore chaos; and what a way to end the record."

Iridescent was elected by Loudwire as the 15th best rock/metal album of 2021. The publication also ranked "Panopticon" as the 24th best metal song of the year.

== Track listing ==
All lyrics are written by Silent Planet; all music is composed by Silent Planet.

Iridescent track listing
No.	Title	Length
1.	"112"	1:12
2.	"Translate the Night"	3:00
3.	"Trilogy"	3:23
4.	"Second Sun"	4:13
5.	"Panopticon"	3:34
6.	"The Sound of Sleep"	3:34
7.	"Alive, as a Housefire"	3:08
8.	"Terminal"	4:47
9.	"(liminal);"	2:01
10.	"Anhedonia"	4:00
11.	"Till We Have Faces"	3:46
12.	"Iridescent"	3:14
Total length:		39:52

== Personnel ==
Credits adapted from album's liner notes.

Silent Planet

- Garrett Russell – lead vocals, guitars
- Mitchell Stark – guitars, clean vocals, production, guitar and bass engineering, sound design
- Thomas Freckleton – bass, keyboards, clean vocals
- Alex Camarena – drums

Additional personnel

- Drew Fulk – production
- Daniel Braunstein – production, vocal engineering
- Chris Ghazel – drum engineering
- Jeff Dunne – mixing, mastering
