= Drunk (Jimmy Liggins song) =

Single by Jimmy Liggins
- A-side: "Drunk"
- B-side: "I'll Never Let You Go"
- Released: 1953
- Label: Specialty
- Songwriter(s): Jimmy Liggins

"Drunk" is a 1953 Jimmy Liggins song. The song was released on Art Rupe's Specialty Records with another Liggins' composition "I'll Never Let You Go" as the B-side. The song "Drunk" has been covered by many artists including Ace Cannon (1971) and Steve Tallis (1986).

The lyrics include the line "Came home one night with a spinning in my head/reached for the pillow, missed the whole darned bed".

The single was a top ten best seller at the end of 1953 into January 1954, according to the Billboard charts, and in the top five of tracks played on jukeboxes.
