= Everything Was Sound =

Studio album by Silent Planet
- Released: July 1, 2016
- Recorded: 2015–2016
- Genre: Metalcore; progressive metal; post-hardcore
- Length: 41:44
- Label: Solid State
- Producer: Will Putney; Spencer Keene

Silent Planet chronology
| The Night God Slept (2014) | Everything Was Sound (2016) | When the End Began (2018) |

Singles from Everything Was Sound
- 1. "Panic Room" Released: May 12, 2016; 2. "Psychescape" Released: June 2, 2016; 3. "Orphan" Released: June 17, 2016

Everything Was Sound is the second studio album by American metalcore band Silent Planet. The album was released on July 1, 2016, through Solid State Records. It was co-produced by Will Putney and guitarist Spencer Keene. This is also the last album to feature Keene.

== Background and promotion ==
On April 27, 2016, the band announced on Vans Warped Tour the album itself and the release date. They released three singles from the record with two of them are accompanying with music videos. "Panic Room" was available on May 12. "Psychescape", featuring Spencer Chamberlain of Underoath, was streaming on June 2. The third and final single, "Orphan", was unveiled on June 17.

== Critical reception ==
Professional ratings
Review scores
| Source | Rating |
|---|---|
| CCM Magazine | 5/5 stars |
| Jesus Freak Hideout | 5/5 stars 4/5 stars 4.5/5 stars |
| New Noise | 5/5 stars |
| Sound Fiction | 8.3/10 |

Matt Conner states, "Everything Was Sound is a killer metalcore album." Kriston McConnell writes, "Silent Planet have written one of the most brutally honest metalcore albums in years." Lucas Munachen describes, "it's difficult to label Everything Was Sound as anything short of a masterpiece." Michael Weaver believes, "Everything Was Sound is certainly one of this year's best heavy albums." Scott Fryberger says, "The Night God Slept was an intense metalcore album that shot them straight up into the 'best of Solid State' group. 2016 is looking to be another strong year for the band, with Everything Was Sound sounding like the next logical step."

== Track listing ==
All tracks are written by Silent Planet.

| No. | Title | Length |
|---|---|---|
| 1. | "Inherit the Earth" | 3:48 |
| 2. | "Psychescape" (featuring Spencer Chamberlain of Underoath) | 3:06 |
| 3. | "Dying in Circles" | 2:58 |
| 4. | "Understanding Love as Loss" | 3:26 |
| 5. | "Tout comprendre" | 0:51 |
| 6. | "Panic Room" | 3:59 |
| 7. | "REDIVIDEЯ" | 3:10 |
| 8. | "Nervosa" (featuring Cory Brandan of Norma Jean) | 3:48 |
| 9. | "C'est tout pardonner" | 2:11 |
| 10. | "Orphan" | 3:47 |
| 11. | "No Place to Breathe" | 2:37 |
| 12. | "First Father" | 4:26 |
| 13. | "Inhabit the Wound" | 3:31 |
| Total length: | | 41:44 |

== Personnel ==
Credits adapted from AllMusic.

Silent Planet

- Garrett Russell – unclean vocals
- Spencer Keene – guitars, production
- Mitchell Stark – guitars
- Thomas Freckleton – bass, keyboards, clean vocals
- Alex Camarena – drums

Additional musicians

- Spencer Chamberlain of Underoath – guest vocals on track 2, "Psychescape"
- Cory Brandan of Norma Jean – guest vocals on track 8, "Nervosa"

Additional personnel

- Will Putney – production, mastering, mixing
- Brandon Ebel – executive production
- Randy Leboeuf – engineering
- R.D. Laing – liner notes
- Adam Skatula – A&R
- Jordan Butcher – art direction, design, illustrations

== Charts ==
| Chart (2016) | Peak position |
|---|---|
| US Billboard 200 | 85 |
| US Christian Albums (Billboard) | 1 |
| US Top Hard Rock Albums (Billboard) | 1 |
| US Independent Albums (Billboard) | 4 |
| US Top Rock Albums (Billboard) | 7 |
