= Superbloom (Silent Planet album) =

Studio album by Silent Planet
- Released: November 3, 2023
- Genres: Metalcore; progressive metalcore
- Length: 39:02
- Label: Solid State
- Producer: Daniel Braunstein

Silent Planet chronology
Iridescent (2021)	Superbloom (2023)	Infinite Sleep (2027)

Singles from Superbloom
- 1. ":Signal:" Released: July 22, 2022; 2. "Antimatter" Released: July 21, 2023; 3. "Collider" Released: August 24, 2023; 4. "Anunnaki" Released: September 22, 2023

Superbloom (stylized in all caps) is the fifth studio album by American metalcore band Silent Planet. The album was released on November 3, 2023, through Solid State Records and was produced by Daniel Braunstein. It is the first album to feature the band's new bassist Nick Pocock, replacing longtime member and clean vocalist Thomas Freckleton earlier in the year. Due to Freckleton's absence, it is the band's first album to extensively feature the clean vocals of Garrett Russell and guitarist Mitchell Stark.

== Background and promotion ==
On July 22, 2022, Silent Planet's first single, ":Signal:", was debuted. On July 21, 2023, the band unveiled the second single "Antimatter" and its corresponding music video.

On August 24, the band published the third single "Collider" and an accompanying music video. At the same time, they officially announced the album itself and release date, whilst also revealing the album cover and the track list. The album's release date holds significance for the band as, on that same date in 2022, they were involved in a serious tour van crash that severely injured Garrett Russell, whose dazed state partly inspired the album's creation.

On September 22, the band released the fourth single "Anunnaki" along with a music video. The music video for "Offworlder" was released November 3, 2023, coinciding with the album release.

== Critical reception ==
Professional ratings
Review scores
Source	Rating
Distorted Sound	9/10
Kerrang!	4/5 stars
Metal Injection	8/10
New Transcendence	7.5/10
Wall of Sound	8.8/10

The album received generally positive reviews from critics. Katie Bird of Distorted Sound scored the album 9 out of 10 and said: "Overall, Superbloom is one of the best metalcore albums of the year. Silent Planet are on top form, and they embrace both their future and past. The production means that the album never loses focus, and by sticking to two very broad genres the band are free to experiment with whatever sounds they like. This album is a tour-de-force and it should definitely be considered Silent Planet's magnum opus." Kerrang! gave the album 4 out of 5 and stated: "A heavy handedness upsets the balance, occasionally. Overproduction robs excellent vocal performances of their humanity to jarring effect here and there, and a few moments of sheer Meshuggah-styled heaviness pale in comparison to the complexity elsewhere." Metal Injection rated the album 8 out of 10 and stated, "At 39 minutes, Superbloom is hardly an indulgent display from Silent Planet. It actually reflects the actual superbloom event. Like a concentrated, emphatic burst of colorful flowers, the title track emerges from the prog-core ether with sweeping dynamics and multi-layered arrangement—all the while maintaining a surprisingly accessible alt-rock undercurrent. It's so soothing, that the final build-up becomes both surprising and fluid in execution."

New Transcendence gave the album a score 7.5/10 and saying: "While most of the songs on Superbloom do feel a little too futuristic for me, it remains a testament to the band's monstrous skill that I still found myself able to enjoy so many songs in a style I usually avoid. 'Antimatter' and 'Offworlder', cyborgs on Superbloom's track list, remain strong tracks in their own right—even if I would probably forsake them for more songs like 'The Overgrowth', 'Annunaki' or 'Superbloom'. This all makes Superbloom my least favorite entry in Silent Planet's robust discography, but also the most truly unique—and like the Superbloom au natural, something you should absolutely bear witness to." Wall of Sound gave the album a score 8.8/10 and saying: "Discovery of Superbloom is likely to lead people back to Silent Planet. Out of great misery and misfortune, the artefact is equal parts aggressive and melodic. Listeners should be wary of their surroundings when ingesting Superbloom as it may compel them to act violently by marching in circles or wanting to launch above a crowd of people. Melodic sections may relieve feelings of loneliness and lead to group hugging. Repeat listens are likely to reveal further feelings that should be shared with others who have also been on Superbloom."

== Track listing ==
All tracks are written by Silent Planet (Alex Camarena, Garrett Russell, Mitchell Stark) and Daniel Braunstein.

Superbloom track listing
No.	Title	Length
1.	"Lights Off the Lost Coast"	1:08
2.	"Offworlder"	3:22
3.	"Collider"	3:41
4.	"Euphoria" (featuring Alejandro Aranda)	3:39
5.	"Dreamwalker"	4:09
6.	"Antimatter"	3:41
7.	":Signal:"	3:29
8.	"Anunnaki"	3:01
9.	"The Overgrowth"	3:01
10.	"Nexus"	3:58
11.	"Reentry"	0:51
12.	"Superbloom"	5:02
Total length:		39:02

== Personnel ==
Silent Planet

- Garrett Russell – lead vocals, guitars
- Mitchell Stark – guitars, keyboards, clean vocals
- Nick Pocock – bass
- Alex Camarena – drums

Additional personnel

- Daniel Braunstein – production
- Buster Odeholm – mixing, mastering
- Alejandro Aranda - clean vocals on "Euphoria"
