= Dreaming Is Sinking /// Waking Is Rising =

Studio album by Dayseeker
- Released: July 14, 2017
- Genre: Metalcore, post-hardcore
- Length: 44:59
- Label: Spinefarm
- Producer: Josh Schroeder

Dayseeker chronology
Origin (2015)	Dreaming Is Sinking /// Waking Is Rising (2017)	Sleeptalk (2019)

Singles from Dreaming Is Sinking /// Waking Is Rising
- 1. "Vultures" Released: June 7, 2017; 2. "Sleep in the Sea – Pt. II" Released: July 10, 2017

Dreaming Is Sinking /// Waking Is Rising is the third studio album by the American post-hardcore band Dayseeker. It was released on July 14, 2017, through Spinefarm Records and was produced by Josh Schroeder.

== Critical reception ==
Professional ratings
Review scores
Source	Rating
Exclaim!	6/10
New Noise Magazine	5/5 stars
Time for Metal	10/10

Connor Atkinson of Exclaim! gave it 6 out of 10 and said: "Frontman Rory Rodriguez's clean vocal performance shines on "Cold, Dark Winter" and "Counterpart", emphasizing the potential that Dayseeker has if they continue to let their sweet spots shine. Here's hoping they do just that on future releases." New Noise Magazine gave the album 5 out of 5 and stated: "If you thought Dayseeker couldn't get even better than their sophomore release, Origin, the band aims to prove you wrong with this one. Dreaming Is Sinking /// Waking Is Rising is potential recognized and unleashed tenfold. Other artists of the genre should take note here. Many, many notes, that is."

== Track listing ==
All tracks are written by Dayseeker.

Dreaming Is Sinking /// Waking Is Rising track listing
No.	Title	Length
1.	"Dreaming Is Sinking"	0:44
2.	"Vultures"	4:00
3.	"Cold, Dark Winter"	3:19
4.	"Abandon"	4:02
5.	"Sleep in the Sea – Pt. II" (featuring Garrett Russell of Silent Planet)	4:38
6.	"Six Feet Under"	4:30
7.	"Hanging by a Thread"	1:56
8.	"Desolate"	3:48
9.	"Carved from Stone"	4:37
10.	"Come Hell or High Water" (featuring J.T. Cavey of Erra)	3:59
11.	"Counterpart"	4:34
12.	"Waking Is Rising"	4:48
Total length:		44:59

== Personnel ==
Dayseeker

- Rory Rodriguez – lead vocals
- Gino Scambelluri – lead guitar, backing vocals
- Shawn Yates – rhythm guitar
- Ramone Valerio – bass, backing vocals
- Mike Karle – drums, percussion

Additional musicians

- Garrett Russell (Silent Planet) – guest vocals on track 5
- J.T. Cavey (Erra) – guest vocals on track 10

Additional personnel

- Josh Schroeder – production, mixing, mastering
- The Forefathers – design, package layout
- Bobby Bates – photography
