= Wynona Carr =

American singer (1923–1976)

Background information
- Also known as: Sister Wynona Carr
- Born: Wynona Merceris Carr; August 23, 1923; Cleveland, Ohio, U.S.
- Died: May 11, 1976 (aged 52) Cleveland, Ohio, U.S.
- Genres: Gospel, R&B, rock and roll
- Occupations: Singer, songwriter

Wynona Merceris Carr (August 23, 1923 – May 11, 1976) was an American gospel, R&B and rock and roll singer-songwriter, who recorded as Sister Wynona Carr when performing gospel material.

== Biography ==
Carr was born in Cleveland, Ohio, where she started out as a gospel singer, forming her own five-piece group The Carr Singers around 1945 and touring the Cleveland/Detroit area. Being tipped by the Pilgrim Travelers, who shared a bill with Carr in the late 1940s, Art Rupe signed her to his Specialty label, giving Carr her new stage name "Sister" Wynona Carr (modelled after pioneering gospel singer Sister Rosetta Tharpe) and cutting some twenty sides with her from 1949 to 1954, including a couple of duets with Specialty's biggest gospel star at the time, Brother Joe May.

Not having too much success on the charts (except for "The Ball Game" [1952], which became one of Specialty's best selling gospel records and most recently featured in the movie 42), Carr grew increasingly unhappy with the straight gospel direction of her career and pleaded with Rupe to let her record "pops, jumps, ballads, and semi-blues". Rupe relented and from 1955 to 1959 Carr recorded two dozen rock and roll and R&B sides for Specialty, which, like her gospel songs, she mostly wrote herself. Despite scoring an R&B hit with "Should I Ever Love Again?" in 1957, overall the change from spiritual to secular music did not help Carr in terms of sales or recognition. She also contracted tuberculosis around this time, which kept her from doing the necessary promotional work and touring for two years, effectively ending her tenure with Specialty in mid 1959.

In 1961, Carr signed with Frank Sinatra's Reprise Records and released an unsuccessful pop album. She moved back to Cleveland, sinking into obscurity and suffering from declining health and depression; she died there in 1976.

== Style and appreciation ==
Carr's contralto vocals have a sensual, husky quality quite unusual (or even inappropriate) for gospel singers in her day, which made her eventual switch to R&B and rock & roll seem a logical choice in retrospect. The same goes for her idiosyncratic use of metaphors and themes in her gospel songs: baseball ("The Ball Game"), boxing ("15 Rounds For Jesus") and a popular TV show ("Dragnet For Jesus"). This penchant for novelty-like songs also shows in Carr's later R&B repertoire, for instance "Ding Dong Daddy", "Nursery Rhyme Rock" and "Boppity Bop (Boogity Boog)".

Carr's gospel recordings are very much influenced by Sister Rosetta Tharpe, incorporating blues and jazz stylings and already touching on R&B with her take on Roy Brown's / Wynonie Harris' "Good Rockin' Tonight", entitled "I Heard The News (Jesus Is Coming Again)". Her early R&B material (for which she is probably best remembered now) was often uptempo, rock & roll-styled and similar in sound to fellow R&B/rock & roll artists on the Specialty roster like Little Richard, Lloyd Price and Larry Williams, with a strong New Orleans-style backbeat and a rich, warm production. Her final Specialty sessions, conducted by Sonny Bono in 1959, cut down on the rock & roll influences.

Both Carr's gospel and R&B recordings went largely unappreciated during the time they were released, but found a new audience when Specialty Records released two CDs, covering Carr's entire output on the label and adding previously unreleased material, such as a recording with Rev. C.L. Franklin (father of Aretha Franklin) and his New Bethel Baptist Church Choir in Detroit. "The Ball Game" got a renewed hearing on the Prairie Home Companion show when Garrison Keillor and the Hopeful Gospel Quartet played it several times in the 2000s. "The Ball Game" was also featured in producer Ken Burns' Baseball on PBS in 1994.

== Selected discography ==
Sister Wynona Carr

- Dragnet For Jesus (Specialty SPCD-7016-2, 1992)

Wynona Carr

- Jump Jack Jump! (Specialty SPCD-7048-2, 1993)
