= What It Means to Be Defeated =

Studio album by Dayseeker
- Released: October 29, 2013
- Studio: Relic Recordings, Whittier, California; Foundation Recording Studio, Connersville, Indiana
- Genre: Post-hardcore; metalcore
- Length: 42:22
- Label: InVogue
- Producer: Jeff Darcy

Dayseeker chronology
| What It Means to Be Defeated (2013) | Origin (2015) |

Singles from What It Means to Be Defeated
- 1. "Resurrect" Released: July 7, 2012; 2. "Collision.Survive" Released: July 8, 2013; 3. "What It Means to Be Defeated" Released: October 6, 2013

What It Means to Be Defeated is the debut studio album by the American post-hardcore band Dayseeker. The album was released on October 29, 2013, through InVogue Records and was produced by Jeff Darcy.

== Promotion and release ==
On July 8, 2013, it was announced that Dayseeker signed a recording contract with InVogue Records. The same day the band released a lyric video from "Hollow Shell" as well as a live music video from "Collision.Survive", which are both featured on the album. The album was mastered by Joey Sturgis who had worked with bands like Emmure, Asking Alexandria and The Devil Wears Prada.

On October 6, 2013, the band released an acoustic video for the same-named song, "What It Means to Be Defeated". The band streamed their entire album three days prior to its release on October 26, 2013, via Alternative Press page. On October 26, 2014, it was announced that the album would be re-issued on November 24, 2014. It was re-mastered by Tom Denney and featured four acoustic bonus tracks.

In promotion of the album, Dayseeker had a three-week concert tour through the United States with metalcore band Kingdom Of Giants in November and December 2013. In April and May the band toured the Artery Across The Nations Tour alongside Upon This Dawning and The Browning. In March and April 2015 the band was part of a concert tour with Courage My Love and Hawthorne Heights.

== Commercial performance ==
On December 3, 2014, it was announced that the re-issue of What It Means to Be Defeated had sold 410 copies after its re-release on November 24, 2014.

== Track listing ==
| No. | Title | Length |
|---|---|---|
| 1. | "Black Earth" | 4:33 |
| 2. | "Collision.Survive" | 4:14 |
| 3. | "What It Means to Be Defeated" | 4:26 |
| 4. | "Incinerate" (featuring Nathan Mead of I, of Helix) | 4:41 |
| 5. | "Hollow Shell" | 4:04 |
| 6. | "Dead Man" | 2:57 |
| 7. | "Resurrect" | 4:02 |
| 8. | "The Home We Built" | 4:33 |
| 9. | "Sleep in the Sea" (featuring Garrett Russell of Silent Planet) | 3:47 |
| 10. | "The Quiet Disconnect" | 5:00 |
| Total length: | | 42:22 |

Deluxe Edition bonus tracks
| No. | Title | Length |
|---|---|---|
| 11. | "The Home We Built" (acoustic) | 4:53 |
| 12. | "Hollow Shell" (acoustic) | 5:12 |
| 13. | "What It Means to Be Defeated" (acoustic) | 5:44 |
| 14. | "Resurrect" (acoustic) | 5:09 |
| Total length: | | 64:02 |

== Personnel ==
Dayseeker

- Rory Rodriguez – lead vocals
- Gino Scambelluri – lead guitar, backing vocals
- Alex Polk – rhythm guitar
- Andrew Sharp – bass
- Mike Karle – drums, percussion

Additional musicians

- Nathan Mead of I, of Helix – guest vocals on track 4
- Garrett Russell of Silent Planet – guest vocals on track 9

Additional personnel

- Jeff Darcy – production, engineering, mixing
- Dayseeker – engineering
- Joey Sturgis – mastering
- Tom Denney – re-mastering
- Eric Rushing – management
- Chris Moore – art direction, design
