= The Midnight =

American synthwave band

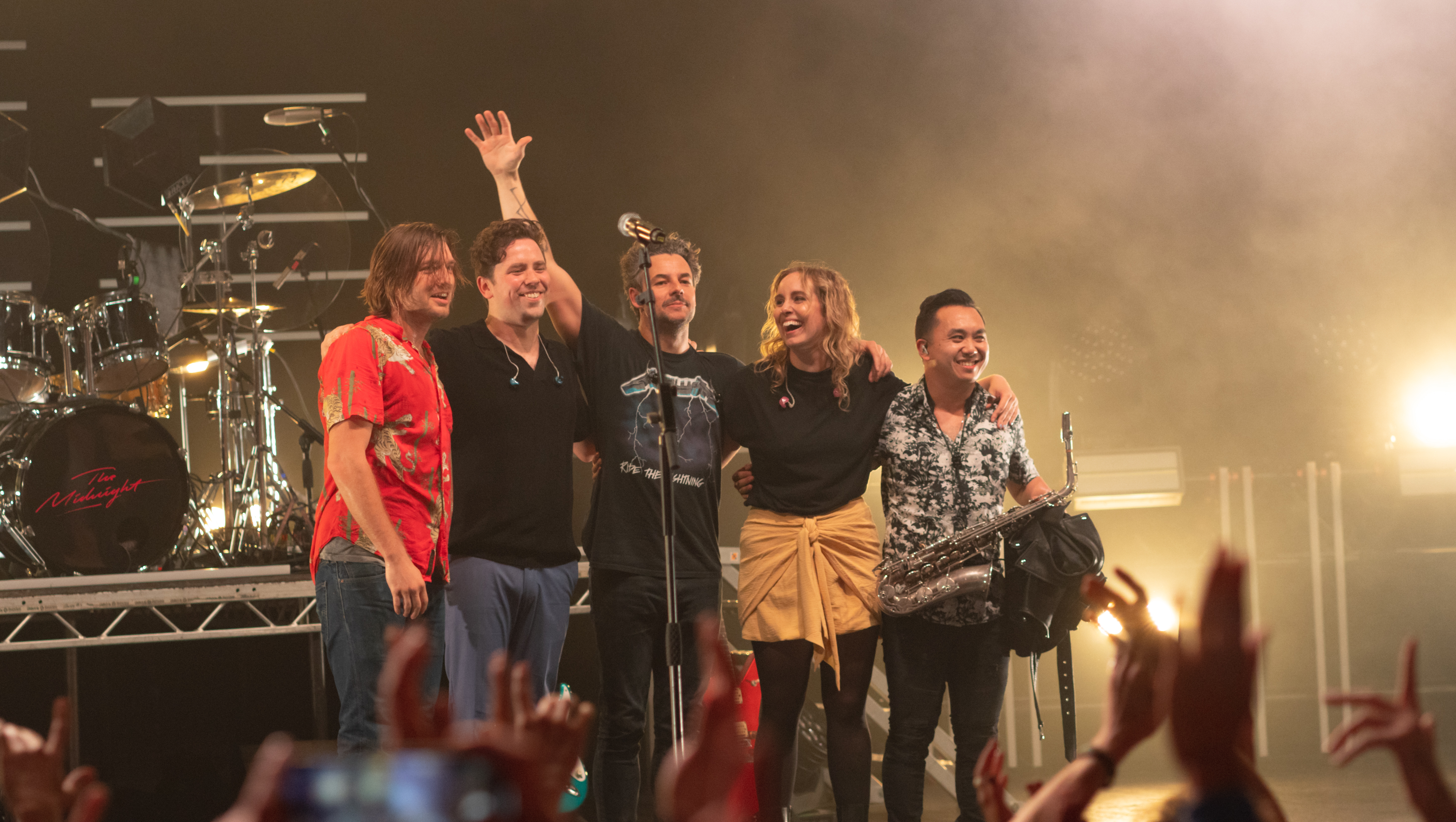
- The Midnight in 2022. From left to right: Tyler Lyle, Royce Whittaker, Tim McEwan, Lelia Broussard, and Justin Klunk.

Background information
- Origin: Los Angeles, California, U.S.
- Genres: Synthwave; futuresynth; electronic; chillwave
- Years active: 2012–present
- Labels: Independent; Counter; Ultra
- Members: Tim McEwan; Tyler Lyle
- Website: themidnightofficial.com

The Midnight is an American synthwave band composed of Atlanta-based singer-songwriter Tyler Lyle and Portland-based Danish producer, songwriter, and singer Tim McEwan.

The band's motto is "mono no aware" (物の哀れ), a Japanese phrase that loosely translates to "a sense of nostalgic wistfulness and the awareness that nothing lasts forever".

== History ==
=== 2012–2014: Formation and Days of Thunder ===
The band was formed as a result of Lyle and McEwan meeting during a co-writing workshop in 2012 in North Hollywood, Los Angeles. Inspired in part by the score for Drive, and the retro synth genre growing around its release, the pair wrote two singles, "WeMoveForward" and "Gloria", that would be released two years later in 2014 as part of their debut EP titled Days of Thunder.

=== 2015–2018: Endless Summer, first remix album, Nocturnal, and touring ===
In 2016, the duo released a 12-track LP, Endless Summer, followed in 2017 with the release of The Midnight Remixed on the Monstercat label.

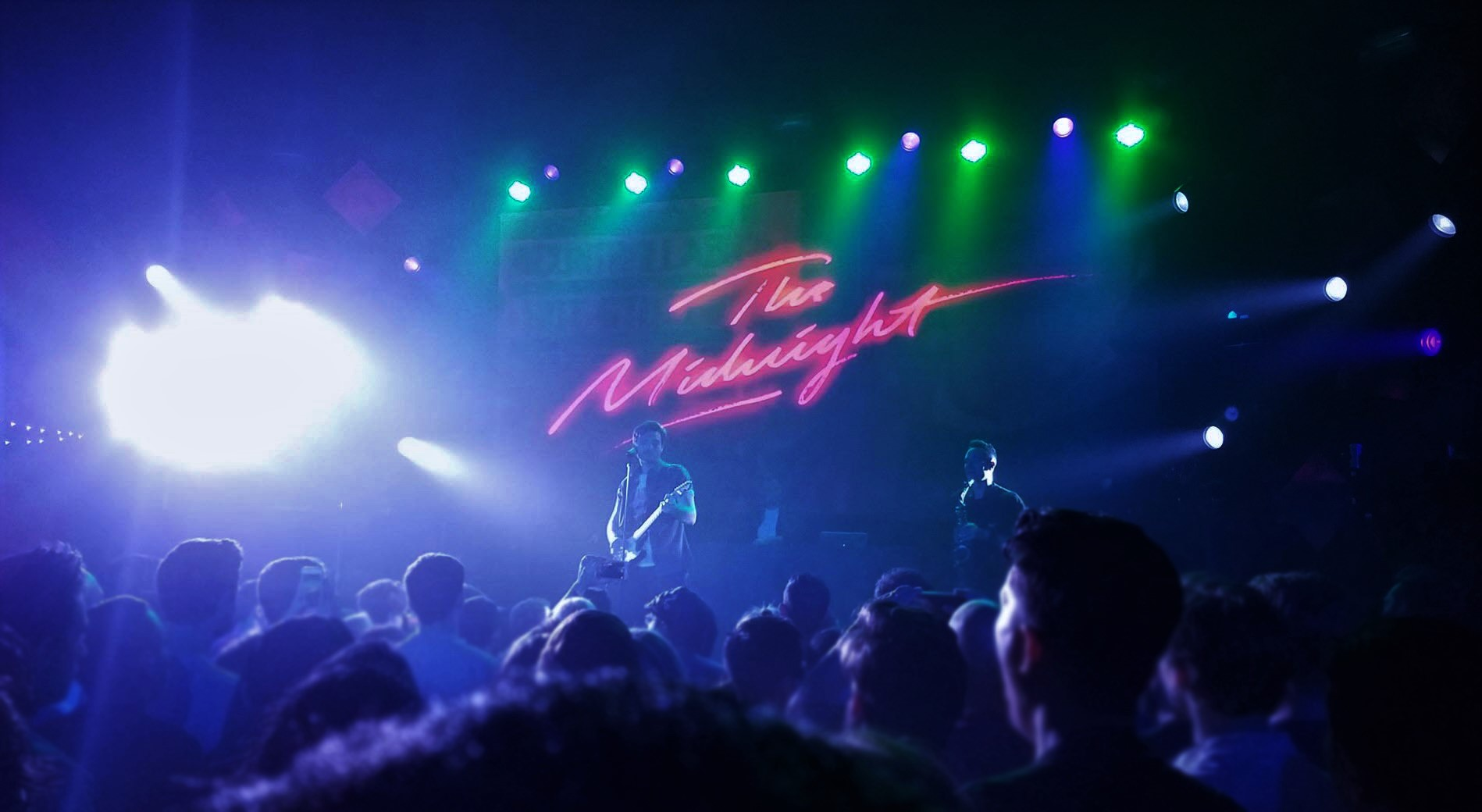
The Midnight's second live show is sold out at Globe Theatre in November 2017.

Their second studio album, Nocturnal, was released in October 2017, which spent several weeks as a best seller on the music distribution website Bandcamp and reached number 17 on Billboard's Dance/Electronic charts in October 2017. The band went on to perform their second sell-out concert, taking place at the Globe Theatre on Broadway in Los Angeles in November 2017. In April 2018, The Midnight announced their first official tour for Fall 2018 with 18 shows across North America.

The band had multiple collaborations with Timecop1983, another retro synth genre producer. One of the collaborations appears on the album Nocturnal, titled "River of Darkness". The other collaboration between them appears on the 2018 album Night Drive of Timecop1983, titled "Static".

=== 2018–2020: Kids, second remix album, and Monsters ===
The Midnight released their third studio album, Kids on September 21, 2018. The album is the first in a trilogy series that shares similar thematic elements.

In 2019, The Midnight Remixed 02 was released on Monstercat. McEwan also appeared in the documentary film The Rise of the Synths, which explored the origins and growth of the synthwave genre. McEwan appeared alongside various other composers from the scene, including John Carpenter, who also starred in and narrated the film.

During the beginning of the COVID-19 pandemic lockdown, The Midnight hosted a remix competition called Remix Radio, providing the stems of multiple songs they had produced on their website for free. On April 3, 2020, the livestream premiered on YouTube for one hour and thirty minutes.

In July 2020, The Midnight released their fourth studio album, Monsters on Counter Records. The album was included on AllMusic's list of the best albums of 2020. The album is a thematic continuation of their previous album Kids, focusing on adolescence, closeness and alienation from the perspective of a teenager.

=== 2020–2023: Horror Show, The Rearview Mirror, Heroes, and live album ===
The Midnight first released their second EP, Horror Show in October 2020 exclusively through Amazon Music. The EP was released to all platforms in March 2021. They followed with the collaborative EP, The Rearview Mirror with Magik*Magik Orchestra in July. The EP features reimagined orchestral versions of songs from Endless Summer to commemorate its fifth anniversary.

The Midnight released their fifth studio album, Heroes in September 2022. It is the third and final album in the Kids trilogy which includes songs that are influenced by hair metal bands and heavy metal, specifically Def Leppard and Mutt Lange.

The band released their live album, Red, White and Bruised: The Midnight Live in September 2023 which featured performances from their Heroes tours.

=== 2024–2026: Graphic novel and Syndicate deluxe ===
The Midnight announced that their first graphic novel, The Midnight: Shadows, would be released by Dark Horse Comics in October 2024. The story and characters are based on The Midnight's music, and the book features writer Zack Kaplan working with artists Stephen Thompson, Johnoy Lindsay, and Thiago Rocha.

In 2024, the band announced McEwan would step away from touring to focus on producing new music. The band added drummer Kwesi Robinson to the lineup to fulfill McEwan's role on live drums.

The Midnight made their Ultra Records debut with the single, "Chariot" in September 2024 from their upcoming sixth studio album, Syndicate. The band followed with their second single, "Love Is an Ocean" in February 2025. Third single "Digital Dreams" released on May 30, 2025. "Chariot" was featured on the soundtrack for the Codemasters racing video game F1 25 which also released the same day. The fourth single "Shadowverse" was released on August 1, along with the reveal of Syndicate's tracklist and October 3, 2025 release date. A fifth single, "Summer's Ending Soon", was released on August 29. A sixth single, "Runaways" featuring Bonnie McKee, was released on September 17.

In an interview with Daily Express, McEwan called Syndicate "our version of an apocalypse record" which had gone through a rework after the band and label mutually agreed the first version wasn't there yet. Lyle called Syndicate "the album that we just couldn't help ourselves from making" with both Lyle and McEwan going through personal trauma during the writing process. Lyle calls the album the denouement of the Kids / Monsters / Heroes trilogy, signaling the closing of a chapter.

The Midnight announced a deluxe version of Syndicate with six additional songs was releasing on May 15, 2026. The expanded album features new songs, unreleased demos, and remixes including their latest single "Love Is an Ocean (Chromeo Remix)".

=== 2026–present: Neon Odyssey and Dayseeker remixes ===
In May 2026, The Midnight collaborated with tabletop gaming group and publishing company Avantris Entertainment to create the theme song and animated music video for "Neon Odyssey", a Dungeons & Dragons 5.5E 1,400+ page, three-book space opera trilogy. The song and cinematic released on May 5 at the opening of the Kickstarter project which surpassed their initial funding goals by raising $2.25m within the first hour of the campaign. Avantris said The Midnight played a huge part in creating the tone and overall vibe of the Neon Odyssey space opera with McEwan calling the collaboration “one of those great experiences – where someone comes to you asking for the thing you really like to do and you know are good at.”

In October 2026, Dayseeker announced a collaboration with The Midnight on their deluxe album Creature in the Black Night Redux, scheduled to release on February 26, 2027. The deluxe album features six remixes including the first single "Shapeshift (The Midnight Remix)". On the collaboration with Dayseeker, The Midnight said, “We've always felt a deep connection to the metal community. For years, I've been wanting to create a genre called 'metalwave,' and this is the first step in that direction. Dayseeker + The Midnight just felt like the perfect fit.”

== Personal lives ==
Tim McEwan's parents are the musician Tom McEwan and actress Terese Damsholt.

== Band members ==
Current

- Tyler Lyle – lead vocals, guitar, synths (2012–present)
- Tim McEwan – producer, percussion, synths, vocals (2012–present)

Touring

- Justin Klunk – saxophone, synths (2022–present)
- Kwesi Robinson – drums and percussion (2024–present)
- Oliver McEwan – music director, bass, synths (2026–present)
- Rhett Shull – guitar, groove boxes, sound design (2026–present)
- OBLVYN – synths, vocals (2026–present)
- James Small – drums and percussion (2026–present)

Former touring

- Nikki Flores – vocals (2017)
- Jesse Molloy – saxophone, synths (2017–2021)
- Alekos "Kosie" Syropoulos – saxophone, synths (2018–2019)
- Jacob Scesney – saxophone (2019)
- Lito Hernandez – saxophone (2019)
- Lelia Broussard – vocals, guitar, bass, synths (2019–2025)
- Royce Whittaker – music director, guitar, synths, vocals (2020–2025)
- Chris Kuffner – guitar, synths (2022)
- Chris Thigpen – bass, synths (2026)

== Discography ==
=== Studio albums ===
Title	Details	Peak chart positions									
Title	Details	US	US Dance	US Indie	AUS	GER	SCO	SWE Phys.	UK	UK Dance	UK Indie
Endless Summer	Released: August 5, 2016; Formats: Cassette, CD, digital download, streaming, vinyl	—	—	—	—	—	—	—	—	—	—
Nocturnal	Released: October 13, 2017; Formats: Cassette, CD, digital download, streaming, vinyl	—	—	—	—	—	—	—	—	—	—
Kids	Released: September 21, 2018; Formats: Cassette, CD, digital download, streaming, vinyl	— (Note: Kids did not enter the US Billboard 200, but peaked at number 73 on the US Billboard Album Sales Chart.)	12	13	—	—	—	—	—	—	44
Monsters	Released: July 10, 2020; Formats: Cassette, CD, digital download, streaming, vinyl	134	3	18	28	—	26	—	85	1	5
Heroes	Released: September 9, 2022; Formats: Cassette, CD, digital download, streaming, vinyl	167	3	22	66	41	13	—	74	—	4
Syndicate	Released: October 3, 2025; Formats: CD, Digital download, streaming, vinyl	— (Note: Syndicate did not enter the US Billboard 200, but peaked at number 13 on the US Billboard Album Sales Chart.)	6	—	90	—	60	15	— (Note: Syndicate did not enter the UK Albums Chart, but peaked at number 23 on the UK Albums Sales Chart.)	—	—
"—" denotes a release that did not chart.

=== Live albums ===
Title	Details
Red, White and Bruised: The Midnight Live	Released: September 1, 2023; Formats: Vinyl, cassette, digital download, streaming

=== Collaborative albums ===
Title	Details
The Midnight Remixed 01	Released: August 14, 2017; Formats: Digital download, streaming
The Midnight Remixed 02	Released: September 27, 2019; Formats: Digital download, streaming

=== Extended plays ===
Title	Details
Days of Thunder	Released: July 15, 2014; Formats: Cassette, CD, digital download, streaming, vinyl
Horror Show	Released: October 16, 2020; Formats: Cassette, Digital download, streaming, vinyl
The Rearview Mirror (with Magik*Magik)	Released: July 23, 2021; Formats: digital download, streaming, vinyl

=== Singles ===
Title	Year	Album
"Years (Prologue)"	2014	Days of Thunder
"WeMoveForward"	2014	Days of Thunder
"Los Angeles"	2014	Days of Thunder
"Endless Summer"	2016	Endless Summer
"Sunset"	2016	Endless Summer
"Vampires"	2016	Endless Summer
"Crystalline"	2017	Nocturnal
"River of Darkness"	2017	Nocturnal
"Light Years"	2017	Nocturnal
"Lost Boy"	2018	Kids
"America 2"	2018	Kids
"Arcade Dreams"	2018	Kids
"Sometimes She Smiles"	2019	Vehlinggo Presents: 5 Years
"America Online"	2019	Monsters
"Deep Blue"	2020	Monsters
"Dance with Somebody"	2020	Monsters
"Prom Night"	2020	Monsters
"Cold Pizza"	2021	Non-album single
"Neon Medusa"	2021	Horror Show
"Change Your Heart or Die"	2022	Heroes
"Heartbeat"	2022	Heroes
"Avalanche"	2022	Heroes
"Brooklyn. Friday. Love"	2022	Heroes
"Heart Worth Breaking"	2022	Heroes
"Land Locked Heart"	2023	Road 96: Mile 0 (Video Game Soundtrack)
"Shadows (Redux)"	2024	Shadows comic vinyl
"Chariot"	2024	Syndicate
"Love Is an Ocean"	2025	Syndicate
"Digital Dreams"	2025	Syndicate
"Shadowverse"	2025	Syndicate
"Summer's Ending Soon"	2025	Syndicate
"Runaways"	2025	Syndicate
"Love Is an Ocean (Chromeo Remix)"	2026	Syndicate (Deluxe)
"Neon Odyssey"	2026	–
"Tonight, Tonight"	2026	Sending Hearts To All My Dearies: A Tribute To The Smashing Pumpkins

=== Remixes ===
Artist	Title	Release date
Tyler Lyle	"Lost & Found (The Midnight Remix)"	March 13, 2016
Drake	"0 to 100 (The Midnight Remix)"	July 2016
Scavenger Hunt	"Never Enough (The Midnight Remix)"	November 8, 2016
ARIZONA	"Oceans Away (The Midnight Remix)"	February 24, 2017
Clubhouse	"Kyra (The Midnight Remix)"	April 10, 2017
Jon Bellion	"80's Films (The Midnight Remix)"	June 25, 2017
The Night Game	"The Outfield (The Midnight Remix)"	April 27, 2018
SYML	"Clean Eyes (The Midnight Remix)"	February 8, 2019
The Ivy	"Missing Out (The Midnight Remix)"	April 21, 2020
Latroit	"Don't Give Up (The Midnight Remix)"	September 25, 2020
Chromeo	"Lost and Found (The Midnight Remix)"	October 4, 2024
Nightly	"1989 (ft. The Midnight)"	October 16, 2026
Dayseeker	"Shapeshift (The Midnight Remix)"	October 22, 2026
From Ashes to New	"Die For You (feat. The Midnight)"	November 13, 2026
Dayseeker	"Pale Moonlight (The Midnight Remix)"	February 26, 2027
Dayseeker	"Crawl Back to My Coffin (The Midnight Remix)"	February 26, 2027
Dayseeker	"Bloodlust (featuring Gabi Rose) (The Midnight Remix)"	February 26, 2027
Dayseeker	"The Living Dead (featuring Sace6) (The Midnight Remix)"	February 26, 2027
Dayseeker	"Creature in the Black Night (The Midnight Remix)"	February 26, 2027

== Tours ==
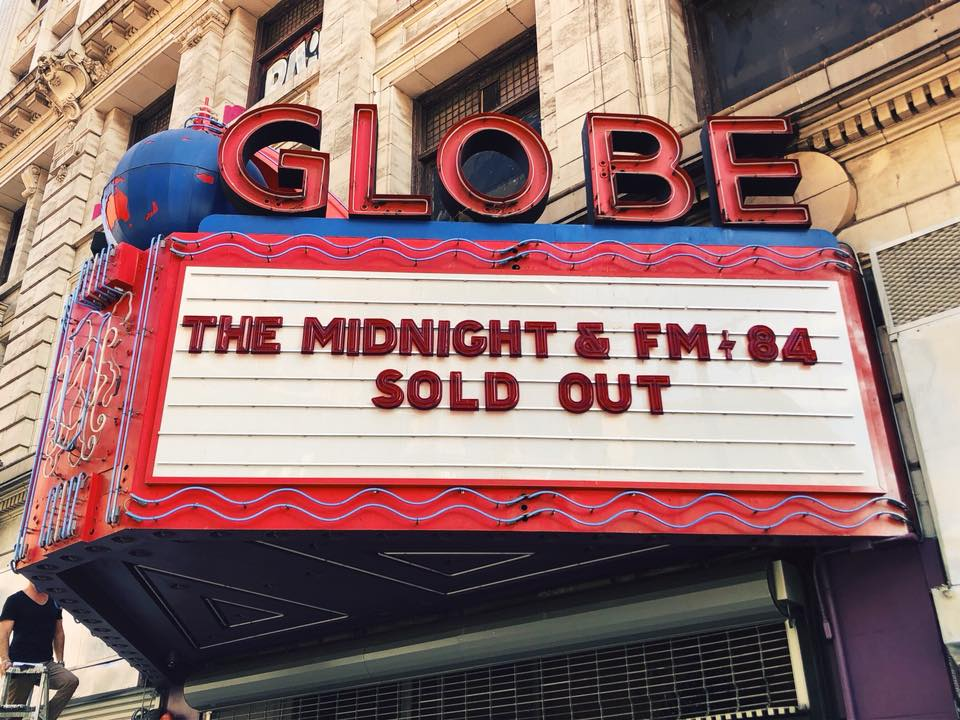
The Midnight's second-ever live show at Globe Theatre, November 2017

Headlining

- Fall 2018 Tour
- Spring 2019 Tour
- Fall 2019 Tour
- Fall 2021 / Spring 2022 Tour
- Change Your Heart Tour (2022–2023)
- Fall 2023 North American Tour
- Summer 2024 EU/UK Tour
- Fall 2025 EU/UK Tour
- Time Machines Tour (2026)

Co-headlining

- Chrome Nights North American Tour (with Chromeo) (2024)
