= Edward Slingerland =

Canadian-American philosopher

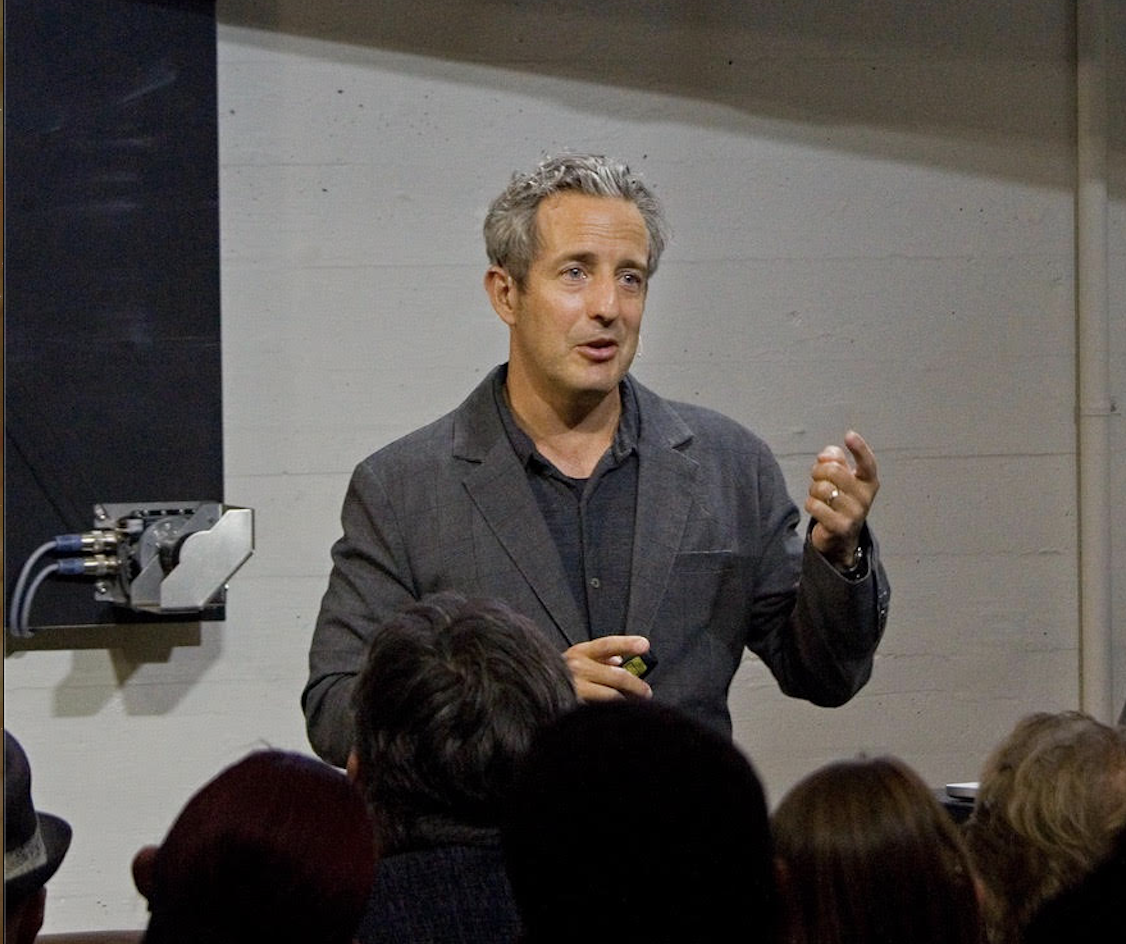
- Born: May 25, 1968 (age 58); Maplewood, New Jersey, United States

Academic background
- Education: Stanford University
- Doctoral advisor: Philip J. Ivanhoe

Academic work
- Discipline: Philosophy, Asian Studies, Psychology
- Institutions: University of British Columbia
- Website: Official website

Edward Slingerland (born May 25, 1968) is a Canadian-American sinologist and philosopher. He is Distinguished University Scholar and Professor of Philosophy at the University of British Columbia, where he also holds appointments in the Departments of Psychology and Asian Studies. His research interests include early Chinese thought, comparative religion and cognitive science of religion, big data approaches to cultural analysis, cognitive linguistics, digital humanities, and humanities-science integration.

== Early life and education ==
As an undergraduate, Slingerland attended Stanford University, where he earned a Bachelor of Arts in Asian Languages (with distinction) in 1991. After earning a Masters of Arts in East Asian Languages (Classical Chinese) at the University of California, Berkeley, he returned to Stanford, where he completed his doctorate in Religious Studies under the supervision of Philip J. Ivanhoe.

== Career ==
From 1998 to 1999, Slingerland taught in the Religious Studies department of University of Colorado, Boulder.

From 1999 to 2005, he held a post at the University of Southern California with a joint appointment in the School of Religion and Department of East Asian Languages and Cultures.

Since 2005, he has been a professor at the University of British Columbia, originally in the Asian Studies department until 2021, when he joined the Philosophy department.

Slingerland is the Director of the Database of Religious History (DRH), an online, quantitative and qualitative encyclopedia of religious cultural history. In 2021, the project received a $4.8 million grant from the John Templeton Foundation.

== Bibliography ==
Slingerland is the author of six academic books as well as two books written for a popular audience. He has also authored and co-authored numerous academic articles, which have appeared in publications such as Nature, Ethics, the Annual Review of Psychology, and the Journal of the American Academy of Religion.

His 2003 book Effortless Action: Wu-wei as Conceptual Metaphor and Spiritual Ideal in Early China was awarded "Best First Book in the History of Religions" by the American Academy of Religion.

=== Academic books ===
- Slingerland, E. (2018). Mind and Body in Early China: Beyond Orientalism and the Myth of Holism. Oxford: Oxford University Press.
- Slingerland, E. (2011). Creating Consilience: Integrating the Sciences and the Humanities. Oxford: Oxford University Press.
- Slingerland, E. (2008). What Science Offers the Humanities: Integrating Body and Culture. Cambridge: Cambridge University Press.
- Slingerland, E. (2006). The Essential Analects: Selected Passages with Traditional Commentary. Indianapolis: Hackett Publishing Company.
- Slingerland, E. (2003). Effortless Action: Wu-wei as Conceptual Metaphor and Spiritual Ideal in Early China. Oxford: Oxford University Press.
- Slingerland, E. (2003). Analects: With Selections from Traditional Commentaries. Indianapolis: Hackett Publishing Company.

=== Popular books ===
- Slingerland, E. (2021). Drunk: How We Sipped, Danced, And Stumbled Our Way To Civilization. Boston: Little, Brown And Company.
- Slingerland, E. (2014). Trying Not to Try: Ancient China, Modern Science, and the Power of Spontaneity. New York: Crown Publishing Group.
