= Drunk (book) =

2021 book

Drunk: How We Sipped, Danced, And Stumbled Our Way To Civilization
- Author: Edward Slingerland
- Genre: Nonfiction
- Publisher: Little, Brown Spark
- Publication date: June 1, 2021
- Pages: 304
- ISBN: 978-0-316-45338-7

Drunk: How We Sipped, Danced, And Stumbled Our Way To Civilization is a nonfiction book by Edward Slingerland. It was published by Little, Brown Spark in 2021.

== Synopsis ==
Written by Canadian-American philosopher Edward Slingerland, the book argues that alcohol has had a positive impact on human civilization. The book argues that alcohol increases social trust and collaboration by reducing inhibitions, and that it encourages creativity. These traits give humanity an edge over other species, allowing human civilization to advance. Slingerland uses evidence from psychology, anthropology, evolutionary biology and human history to argue that alcohol provides benefits to society that can outweigh costs like addiction and negative health effects.

== Reception ==
The book received mostly positive reviews from critics. In a review for The New York Times, Zoë Lescaze wrote that "Slingerland takes up the cause with all the chivalry of a knight-errant, and his infectious passion makes this book a romp as well as a refreshingly erudite rejoinder to the prevailing wisdom." Peter Gray, in Evolutionary Studies in Imaginative Culture, "just under 300 pages of fact-filled, thought-provoking, humorous and engaging prose, telling a rich story of alcohol in human social life."

Publishers Weekly, Vijaysree Venkatraman of New Scientist, Camper English of The Alcohol Professor and Jeffrey Meyer of Library Journal described it as entertaining, informative and well researched.

Kirkus Reviews and Ralph Peterson of Seattle Book Review, gave the book more negative reviews, describing its arguments as repetitive and unconvincing.

== See also ==
- History of alcoholic drinks
