= Sleeptalk (album) =

Studio album by Dayseeker
- Released: September 27, 2019
- Genre: Post-hardcore; metalcore
- Length: 36:30
- Label: Spinefarm
- Producer: Daniel Braunstein

Dayseeker chronology
Dreaming Is Sinking /// Waking Is Rising (2017)	Sleeptalk (2019)	Dark Sun (2022)

Singles from Sleeptalk
- 1. "Crooked Soul" Released: April 5, 2019; 2. "Sleeptalk" Released: August 2, 2019; 3. "Burial Plot" Released: September 6, 2019

Sleeptalk is the fourth studio album by the American post-hardcore band Dayseeker. The album was released on September 27, 2019, through Spinefarm Records and was produced by Daniel Braunstein.

== Critical reception ==
Professional ratings
Review scores
Source	Rating
Distorted Sound	8/10

Distorted Sound scored the album 8 out of 10 and said: "Whether or not Dayseeker will quite reinvent the genre remains to be seen, but they have certainly reinvented themselves. Sleeptalk is the album that will drive their career forwards, and sees them step out of a pigeon hole and into the light."

== Track listing ==
All tracks are written by Michael Karle, Rory Rodriguez, Gino Sgambelluri, Ramone Valerio, and Daniel Braunstein, except where noted.

Sleeptalk track listing
No.	Title	Writer(s)	Length
1.	"Drunk"		3:40
2.	"Crooked Soul"	Karle; Rodriguez; Sgambelluri; Valerio; Braunstein; Mitchell Stark	3:55
3.	"Burial Plot"		3:57
4.	"Sleeptalk"		3:43
5.	"The Embers Glow"		1:22
6.	"The Color Black"		4:03
7.	"Already Numb"	Karle; Rodriguez; Sgambelluri; Valerio; Braunstein; Mike Stringer	4:02
8.	"Gates of Ivory"	Karle; Rodriguez; Sgambelluri; Valerio; Braunstein; Seneca Pettee	3:54
9.	"Starving to Be Empty"	Karle; Rodriguez; Sgambelluri; Valerio	3:43
10.	"Crash and Burn"	Karle; Rodriguez; Sgambelluri; Valerio	4:08
Total length:			36:30

Deluxe edition bonus tracks
No.	Title	Writer(s)	Length
11.	"Drunk (Reimagined)"	Karle; Rodriguez; Braunstein	3:53
12.	"Burial Plot (Reimagined)" (featuring Seneca)	Karle; Rodriguez; Braunstein	4:02
13.	"Crooked Soul (Reimagined)"	Karle; Rodriguez; Braunstein	3:56
14.	"Sleeptalk (Reimagined)"	Karle; Rodriguez; Braunstein	3:48
Total length:			52:10

== Personnel ==
Credits adapted from the album's liner notes and Tidal.

=== Dayseeker ===
- Rory Rodriguez – lead vocals (all tracks); bass, guitar, production (track 2)
- Ramone Valerio – bass (1–10)
- Gino Scambelluri – guitar (1–10)
- Mike Karle – drums (1–10); percussion, engineering (11–14)

=== Additional contributors ===
- Daniel Braunstein – production (all tracks), additional mixing (1–10); keyboards, engineering (11–14)
- Henrik Udd – mixing, mastering (1–10)
- Jim Hughes – package layout, design
- Kaytlin Dargen – photography
- Mitchell Stark – guitar, production (2)
- Mike Stringer – guitar (8)
- Seneca Pettee – additional vocals (9), lead vocals (12)
