= Dark Sun (album) =

Studio album by Dayseeker
- Released: November 4, 2022
- Genres: Post-hardcore; metalcore
- Length: 39:42
- Label: Spinefarm
- Producer: Daniel Braunstein

Dayseeker chronology
Sleeptalk (2019)	Dark Sun (2022)	Replica (2024)

Dayseeker studio album chronology
Sleeptalk (2019)	Dark Sun (2022)	Creature in the Black Night (2025)

Singles from Dark Sun
- 1. "Neon Grave" Released: March 25, 2022; 2. "Without Me" Released: August 26, 2022; 3. "Dreamstate" Released: September 23, 2022; 4. "Crying While You're Dancing" Released: October 27, 2022

Dark Sun is the fifth studio album by the American post-hardcore band Dayseeker. The album was released on November 4, 2022, through Spinefarm Records and was produced by Daniel Braunstein.

== Critical reception ==
Professional ratings
Review scores
Source	Rating
Hysteria Magazine	8/10
Kerrang!	3/5
Sputnikmusic	3.5/5

Kerrang! gave the album 3 out of 5 and stated: "There are aspirations for grandiosity on tracks like "Neon Grave", and the poignant "Midnight Eternal" does hit hard, but by the time the obligatory, uninspired acoustic number "Paper Heart" rolls in, you're feeling empty. Ultimately it's not a bad record, but it also doesn't leave much of an impact."

== Track listing ==
All tracks are written by Dayseeker.

Dark Sun track listing
No.	Title	Length
1.	"Dreamstate"	3:39
2.	"Neon Grave"	4:00
3.	"Without Me"	3:44
4.	"Homesick"	3:47
5.	"Midnight Eternal"	2:35
6.	"Dark Sun"	3:38
7.	"Quicksand" (featuring Spencer Stewart)	3:31
8.	"Paper Heart"	3:54
9.	"Crying While You're Dancing"	3:35
10.	"Parallel"	3:07
11.	"Afterglow (Hazel's Song)"	4:12
Total length:		39:42

== Personnel ==
Credits adapted from the album's liner notes.

Dayseeker

- Rory Rodriguez – lead vocals
- Gino Scambelluri – guitars, backing vocals
- Ramone Valerio – bass, backing vocals
- Mike Karle – drums, percussion

Additional musicians

- Spencer Stewart – guest vocals on track 7

Additional personnel

- Daniel Braunstein – production
- Henrik Udd – mixing, mastering

Imagery

- Ryan Sanders – art direction and design (Mdrn Dvsn)
