= Dayseeker =

American post-hardcore band

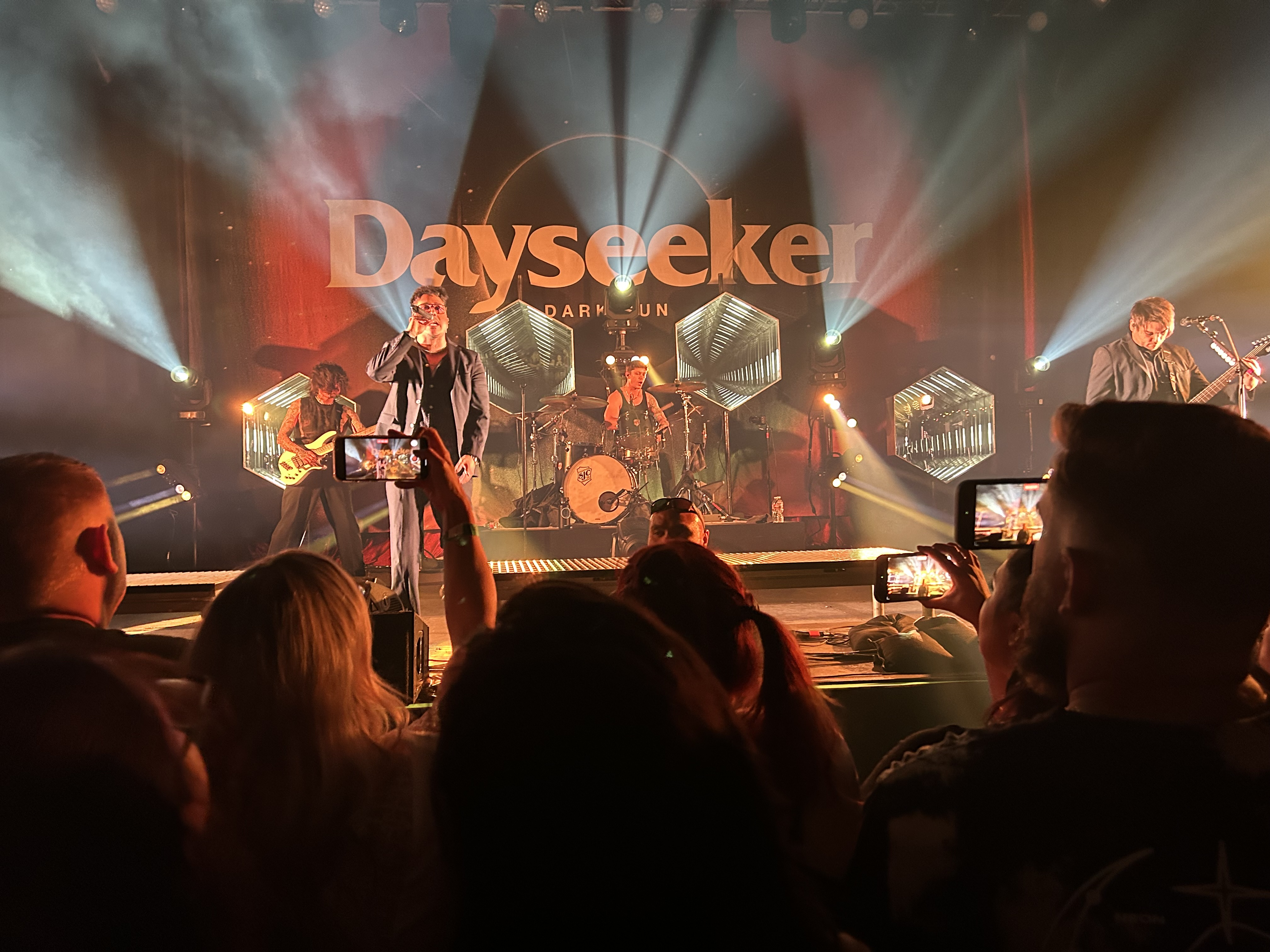
- Dayseeker playing in Las Vegas during their Dark Sun tour

Background information
- Origin: Orange County, California, U.S.
- Genres: Post-hardcore; metalcore
- Works: Discography
- Years active: 2012–present
- Labels: Spinefarm; InVogue
- Members: Rory Rodriguez; Zac Mayfield; Ramone Valerio
- Past members: Matt Steenstra; Andrew Sharp; Alex Polk; Shawn Yates; Mike Karle; Gino Sgambelluri
- Website: dayseeker.band

Dayseeker is an American post-hardcore band formed in Orange County, California, in 2012. The group consists of vocalist Rory Rodriguez, bassist Ramone Valerio and drummer Zac Mayfield. They are currently signed to Spinefarm Records and have released six studio albums. Their most recent studio album, Creature in the Black Night, was released on October 24, 2025 with a Redux deluxe edition scheduled to release on February 26, 2027.

== History ==
=== Formation and What It Means to Be Defeated (2012–2014) ===
Dayseeker was formed in 2012 by vocalist Rory Rodriguez, guitarists Alex Polk and Matt Steenstra, bassist Andrew Sharp and drummer Mike Karle in Orange near Anaheim, California. Rory Rodriguez and Alex Polk were members of Arms Like Yours, and Mike Karle, Andrew Sharp, and Matt Steenstra were members of Southern Lights before forming Dayseeker.

The band released a series of demos including the songs "What It Means to Be Defeated", "Collision.Survive" and "Resurrect", which were released on their debut record as well as two untitled songs. On July 7, 2013, the band was signed to InVogue Records, which released their debut album What It Means to Be Defeated on October 29, 2013. It featured work by Joey Sturgis, who mastered the record. On November 24, 2014, the album was re-released. Tom Denney, a former guitarist of A Day to Remember was involved in producing the re-released version of the album. The re-issue features three acoustic tracks.

In November and December 2013 the band toured the United States on a three-week tour alongside Kingdom of Giants. In April and May 2014 the band was part of the Artery Across the Nation Tour, which featured Upon This Dawning and The Browning in the line-up.

=== Origin (2014–2016) ===
On December 23, 2014, the band announced they would be a part of the Hawthorne Heights tour between March and April 2015. After that tour, the band then shared the stage with Silent Planet in April and May 2015 to promote Origin.

In January 2015, the band announced they were to begin recording the follow-up to their debut album What It Means to Be Defeated with producer Nick Ingram, who had worked with Hotel Books and Before Their Eyes in the past. On March 9, 2015, it was announced that the album was entitled Origin and would be released on April 21, 2015. The same day the same-titled lead single as well as the pre-orders were announced, the band released a cover of Nick Jonas' song "Jealous".

=== Dreaming Is Sinking /// Waking Is Rising (2016–2018) ===
The band members Alex Polk and Andrew Sharp departed from the band in the spring of 2016. Shawn Yates, former member of At the Skylines, served as the new guitarist. On December 15, 2016, the band announced their departure from InVogue Records and that they had signed with Spinefarm Records. Shortly after, they announced a U.S. tour with headliner Silent Planet, along with Ghost Key and Hail the Sun, which began in February 2017. A year after the release of Origin, Dayseeker announced a new studio album set to release in 2017. The third album, Dreaming Is Sinking /// Waking Is Rising, was released by Spinefarm on July 14, 2017.

=== Sleeptalk (2019–2021) ===
On September 27, 2019, Dayseeker released their fourth studio album entitled Sleeptalk. Just before its second anniversary, the deluxe edition of Sleeptalk was released, including stripped-down reimagined versions of the first four songs: "Drunk", "Crooked Soul", "Burial Plot", and "Sleeptalk".

In the fall of 2021, Oh, Sleeper drummer Zac Mayfield announced that he would be temporarily filling in for Mike Karle for the foreseeable future. Karle returned to the group the following fall.

=== Dark Sun and Replica (2022–2024) ===
On March 25, 2022, Dayseeker released the song "Neon Grave". Rodriguez confirmed the progress on a new album, stating that he has found himself immersed in the emotions that came with the loss of his father shortly after his daughter's unexpected birth. In an interview with Boolin Tunes, Rodriguez revealed that he initially intended to only write one song about his grief and then 'move on', but it quickly grew to engulf the writing sessions and he knew that it would take the majority of an album to properly represent his emotions. Their fifth studio album, Dark Sun, was released on November 4, 2022.

On February 14, 2024, the band announced Replica, an album containing acoustic versions of songs from Sleeptalk and Dark Sun, in addition to a cover of My Immortal by Evanescence. Alongside the announcement, Dayseeker released the first single from the album, "Burial Plot", featuring Caleb Shomo of Beartooth. Other featured artists include Lucas Woodland from Holding Absence and Amber DeLaRosa. The album was released digitally on April 19 and physically on June 14.

=== Creature in the Black Night and Sgambelluri's departure (2025–present) ===
On April 23, 2025, Dayseeker released the song "Pale Moonlight". On July 9, 2025, the band released another single, "Creature in the Black Night". That same day, their sixth studio album, Creature in the Black Night, was announced. It was released on October 24. The band confirmed in a track-by-track with Valentino Petrarca from The Aquarian, they worked closely with producer Dan Braunstein throughout the entire process.

On November 6, 2025, the band announced that they were parting ways with Sgambelluri.

On October 22, 2026, the band released a remix of "Shapeshift" featuring The Midnight and announced a deluxe edition of Creature in the Black Night, entitled Creature in the Black Night Redux, scheduled for release February 26, 2027.

== Musical style ==
Dayseeker are a band known primarily by their post-hardcore and metalcore sound in their musical style. However, they are frequently accepted in an array of other genres such as emo, screamo, post-emo, hard rock, alternative rock, and synthwave, as the band has continually evolved over the years.

== Band members ==
Current

- Rory Rodriguez – lead vocals (2012–present)
- Ramone Valerio – bass, backing vocals (2017–present)
- Zac Mayfield – drums, percussion (2022–present)

Former

- Matt Steenstra – rhythm guitar (2012)
- Andrew Sharp – bass (2012–2016)
- Alex Polk – rhythm guitar (2012–2016)
- Shawn Yates – rhythm guitar (2016–2018)
- Mike Karle – drums, percussion (2012–2022)
- Gino Sgambelluri – lead guitar, backing vocals (2012–2025); rhythm guitar (2018–2025)

Touring

- Mitch Stark – lead guitar, backing vocals (2025–present)
- Devin Chance – bass (2026–present)

Timeline

== Discography ==
Studio albums

- What It Means to Be Defeated (2013)
- Origin (2015)
- Dreaming Is Sinking /// Waking Is Rising (2017)
- Sleeptalk (2019)
- Dark Sun (2022)
- Creature in the Black Night (2025)

== Awards and nominations ==
Year	Organization	Award	Nominee / Work	Result	Ref.
2025	Nik Nocturnal Awards	Vocalist of the Year	Rory Rodriguez	Nominated	
2025	Nik Nocturnal Awards	Feels Are Reals	"Pale Moonlight"	Nominated	
2025	Nik Nocturnal Awards	Music Video of the Year	"Pale Moonlight"	Nominated	
2025	Nik Nocturnal Awards	Radio Song of the Year	"Pale Moonlight"	Nominated	
2025	Nik Nocturnal Awards	Album of the Year	Creature in the Black Night	Nominated	
2026	Morecore Music Awards	Best Album Artwork	Creature in the Black Night	Won	
2026	Morecore Music Awards	Best Album	Creature in the Black Night	Nominated	
2026	Morecore Music Awards	Music Video of the Year	"Crawl Back to My Coffin"	Nominated	
