= Kids (The Midnight album) =

2018 studio album by The Midnight

Studio album by The Midnight
- Released: September 21, 2018
- Recorded: 2017–2018
- Studios: Red Bull Studios (Los Angeles, CA)
- Genre: Synthwave
- Length: 33:51
- Label: The Midnight Music
- Producer: Tim McEwan

The Midnight chronology
Nocturnal (2017)	Kids (2018)	Monsters (2020)

Singles from Kids
- 1. "Lost Boy" Released: July 13, 2018; 2. "America 2" Released: August 3, 2018; 3. "Arcade Dreams" Released: September 7, 2018

Professional ratings
Review scores
Source	Rating
The Music (magazine)	4/5 stars
Sputnikmusic	3.5/5 stars

Kids is the third studio album by synthwave band The Midnight. It was released independently on September 21, 2018.

== Background ==
The album was publicly teased in a November 2017 interview with Vehlinggo following the release of Nocturnal. A new, more "summer-feeling" EP was planned for release in spring or summer 2018.

The Midnight released their third studio album, Kids on September 21, 2018. The album is the first in a trilogy series that shares similar thematic elements.

== Track listing ==
All tracks are written by Tim McEwan and Tyler Lyle, alongside additional writers, as noted.

No.	Title	Writer(s)	Length
1.	"Youth"		3:09
2.	"Wave"		4:31
3.	"Kids" (Prelude)		2:13
4.	"Lost Boy"	Lenno Linjama	4:37
5.	"Saturday Mornings" (Interlude)		0:57
6.	"Explorers"		4:16
7.	"America 2"		4:01
8.	"Arcade Dreams"		4:03
9.	"Kids" (Reprise)		6:04
Total length:			33:51

== Personnel ==
Credits adapted from the album's liner notes.

The Midnight

- Tyler Lyle – vocals
- Tim McEwan – production, mixing

Additional Personnel

- Kasper Falkenberg – guitar (2, 9)

Production

- James Musshorn – engineer
- Anders Schumann – mastering

Visuals

- Aaron Campbell – album artwork

Locations

- Recorded at Red Bull Studios (Los Angeles, CA).

== Charts ==
Chart performance for Kids
Chart (2018)	Peak position
US Top Album Sales (Billboard)	73
US Top Dance Albums (Billboard)	12
US Top Current Album Sales (Billboard)	62
US Independent Albums (Billboard)	13
