= Art Rupe =

American music industry executive (1917–2022)

- Also known as: Arthur N. Rupe; Arthur Newton Rupe
- Born: Arthur Goldberg; September 5, 1917; Greensburg, Pennsylvania, U.S.
- Died: April 15, 2022 (aged 104) Santa Barbara, California, U.S.
- Occupations: Record executive, record producer
- Years active: 1945–2013
- Label: Specialty Records

Arthur Newton Rupe (born Arthur Goldberg; September 5, 1917 – April 15, 2022) was an American music executive and record producer. He founded Specialty Records, known for its rhythm and blues, blues, gospel and early rock and roll music recordings, in Los Angeles in 1946.

== Early years ==
Rupe was born Arthur Goldberg. He was born to a working-class Jewish family on September 5, 1917, in the Pittsburgh suburb of Greensburg, Pennsylvania and grew up in nearby McKeesport. His father was a factory worker who had immigrated from Galicia, and his mother was a housewife born in Pittsburgh. As a boy, he listened to music sung at a local black Baptist church. He attended college at Virginia Tech, Miami University, and University of California, Los Angeles. During World War II, he worked for a shipbuilding company in Los Angeles. Along the way, he changed his surname from Goldberg to Rupe, which was an ancestral name.

== Career ==
Toward the end of the war, Rupe resolved to get into the entertainment industry. After losing money he had invested in a small record company, he spent $200 on what were called "race records" at the time to systematically analyze them and determine the formula for records that would sell. He decided that the secret lay in a big band sound with a churchy feel. He found the recording talent he needed in the many after-hours clubs in the Watts district.

He and Ben Siegert first established Juke Box Records in 1944 and after a few hits, he broke with his partners and started a new company, Specialty Records. The label soon thrived with Roy Milton, Percy Mayfield, and Jimmy Liggins, along with a very successful gospel catalog. The major producers for the label were Rupe, Robert "Bumps" Blackwell, and J.W. Alexander. Johnny Vincent was a sales representative for the company.

Rupe had a love of gospel music, and in 1947 he began recording gospel quartets such as the Soul Stirrers, the Swan Silvertones, the Pilgrim Travelers, Alex Bradford, Dorothy Love Coates and Sister Wynona Carr. His taste for gospel carried over into secular music and influenced his choice of artists to record, such as Guitar Slim, Don and Dewey, Lloyd Price, Larry Williams, and Little Richard. It led him to value feeling over technique in the recording studio.

Concerns about religious objections to the secularization of gospel music, combined with a contract dispute, resulted in his decision not to put out a pop record with gospel singer Sam Cooke. He recorded but ultimately chose not to release two songs that later became big hits, "You Send Me" and "Summertime".

In 1952, Rupe first traveled to New Orleans because of his attraction to the gospel sound of Fats Domino who played piano in the band of Dave Bartholomew, a former trumpeter with Duke Ellington. It was on this trip that he auditioned and then recorded Lloyd Price.

Rupe obtained his most successful artist when Little Richard, then a little-known recording artist, followed Lloyd Price's suggestion and sent Rupe a demo record. Rupe sent Blackwell to New Orleans to do a recording session, and during a recording break Little Richard sang an obscene song while playing the piano. Blackwell sensed that it was a hit, but after the lyrics had been cleaned up, there was no time to teach the song to a piano player. So Little Richard both played and sang the only song to emerge from that first session, done in just three takes, "Tutti Frutti", one of the most significant rock and roll records ever made. Rupe also recorded Guitar Slim, with a young Ray Charles on piano. In addition, Specialty issued some of the wildest R&B records, such as "Cherokee Dance", by Froggy Landers; "(Everytime I Hear) That Mellow Saxophone", by Roy Montrell; "Drunk" by Jimmy Liggins; and the rock & roll "Moose on the Loose", by Roddy Jackson.

The contracts that Specialty Records gave the artists to sign left Rupe and others at the label with full ownership and publishing rights of the music. Little Richard signed a contract with Specialty in 1955, and reportedly gave the label full ownership of all the music he recorded with them in return for 50% of the royalties earned. In his authorized biography, he states that he sold his publishing rights to "Tutti Frutti" for fifty dollars, leaving him with a small half-cent royalty rate per record sold. In 1959, Little Richard left the label and filed a lawsuit claiming he never received his royalties. He settled for $11,000 and waived his rights to royalties from such hits as "Tutti Frutti" and "Long Tall Sally".

During the 1960s and later, Rupe became increasingly involved in oil and gas investments. Success in this area allowed him to establish the Arthur N. Rupe Foundation, a philanthropy based in Santa Barbara. When asked why Specialty was so successful, Rupe credited his own ability to produce rather than his business skills. In the early 1960s, he stopped producing records but remained active in the music business as a publisher. He returned during the 1950s-revival period in the late 1960s, but only to reissue landmark recordings of the R&B era. Rupe sold Specialty to Fantasy Records in 1991.

== Later years and death ==
Rupe turned 100 in September 2017. He died on April 15, 2022, at his home in Santa Barbara, California. He was 104 years old.

== Honors ==
Rupe was inducted into the Blues Hall of Fame in 2007. In 2011, he (along with former Elektra Records founder Jac Holzman) was awarded the Ahmet Ertegun Award by the Rock and Roll Hall of Fame. According to the citation, Rupe "brought R&B and soul into the mainstream and launched Little Richard's career. Rupe's fastidious work ethic and uncanny musical intuition shaped the evolution of rock."
