= Sace6 =

American alternative metal duo

- Origin: Long Island, NY
- Genres: Metalcore; Alternative Metal; R&B; Pop metal
- Years active: 2021–present
- Label: Sumerian Records
- Members: Sace Noah Thomas
- Website: sace6.com

Sace6 (stylized in lowercase) is an American alternative metal duo consisting of lead vocalist Sace and guitarist-vocalist Noah Thomas. Originally the solo project of Sace, the project developed into a duo in 2024. Sonically, their music offers contrasting melodic vocals and pop-oriented hooks with heavy guitar-driven instrumentation.

Known for their monochromatic visual aesthetic and emotionally focused songwriting, their debut studio album, brutalist, was released on May 8, 2026, through Sumerian Records. It incorporates elements of metalcore, pop, R&B and shoegaze.

== History ==
Sace began releasing music independently in 2021, initially performing under the name sace6 as a solo artist. Early releases included "white Jeep" and "wish I didn't see that", released in April 2021. The project continued to release singles throughout 2021 and 2022, gradually developing an online following.

By 2024, sace6 had developed into a duo consisting of Sace and longtime collaborator Noah Thomas. Thomas contributes guitar, vocals and production to the project.

The duo's collaboration expanded the project's sound toward a combination of alternative metal, pop and R&B.

In 2024, sace6 released the single "saturate", followed by the desaturated release. In 2025, the duo released several singles and their Limerence EP, including "devotion", "said and done", "velvet" and "easy exit".

=== brutalist (2026) ===
In January 2026, sace6 released "ego", the first single associated with their debut studio album brutalist. The album was subsequently released on May 8, 2026, through Sumerian Records.

The album was preceded and accompanied by several singles, including "ego", "covet", "allured", "reverie" and "basorexia".

== Members ==
Current

- Sace – vocals
- Noah Thomas – guitar, vocals, production

== Discography ==
=== Studio albums ===
- brutalist (2026)

=== EPs ===
- Limerence (2025)
- Buried again (2024)
- Bled (2023)
