= Lelia Broussard =

American musician

- Birth name: Lelia Elizabeth Broussard
- Born: May 24, 1989 (age 36); Lafayette, Louisiana, U.S.
- Origin: Philadelphia, Pennsylvania, U.S.
- Genres: pop, indie pop, Folk-pop
- Occupation(s): Singer/songwriter, artist
- Instrument(s): Vocals, guitar, bass guitar
- Years active: 2004–present
- Labels: Rondor Music Publishing
- Website: leliabroussard.com

Lelia Elizabeth Broussard is an American musician and member of indie pop duo Jupiter Winter. As a solo artist she has released four albums independently as well as a number of EPs and singles.

== Early life and education ==
Broussard was born and raised in Lafayette, Louisiana. At the age of 10 her family moved to Philadelphia where she began playing the guitar and writing songs.

== Career ==
Broussard began her career by playing open mic shows in the Philadelphia music scene. After radio appearances and concerts she released her debut EP "Louisiana Soul" when she was 15. She would go on to release her first full-length album "lil-yah" at 17, recorded at Morningstar studios in the summer of 2005.

After moving to New York, Broussard released her second album "Rise" in 2007 whose title song was featured on MTV's The Hills (TV series).

Broussard's third album "Masquerade" in 2010 was largely funded through a kickstarter campaign. The album was produced by Dan Romer who contributed heavily to its instrumentation.

Broussard became one of two finalists in the "Choose The Cover of Rolling Stone" contest where she performed on Late Night with Jimmy Fallon. Broussard was involved in another music competition in 2012 when she was chosen to compete on the American television vocal talent show The Voice.

Broussard formed indie rock band Secret Someones as bassist with Bess Rogers, Hannah Winkler, and Zach Jones in the summer of 2013. In 2015 the band would release their debut album on Cherrytree Records.

Broussard began touring with Synthwave act The Midnight in 2019 as bassist, guitarist and vocalist.

== Discography ==
- lil-yah (2005)
- Rise (2007)
- Waiting On The 9 (2008)
- Masquerade (2011)
