= Silent Planet =

American metalcore band

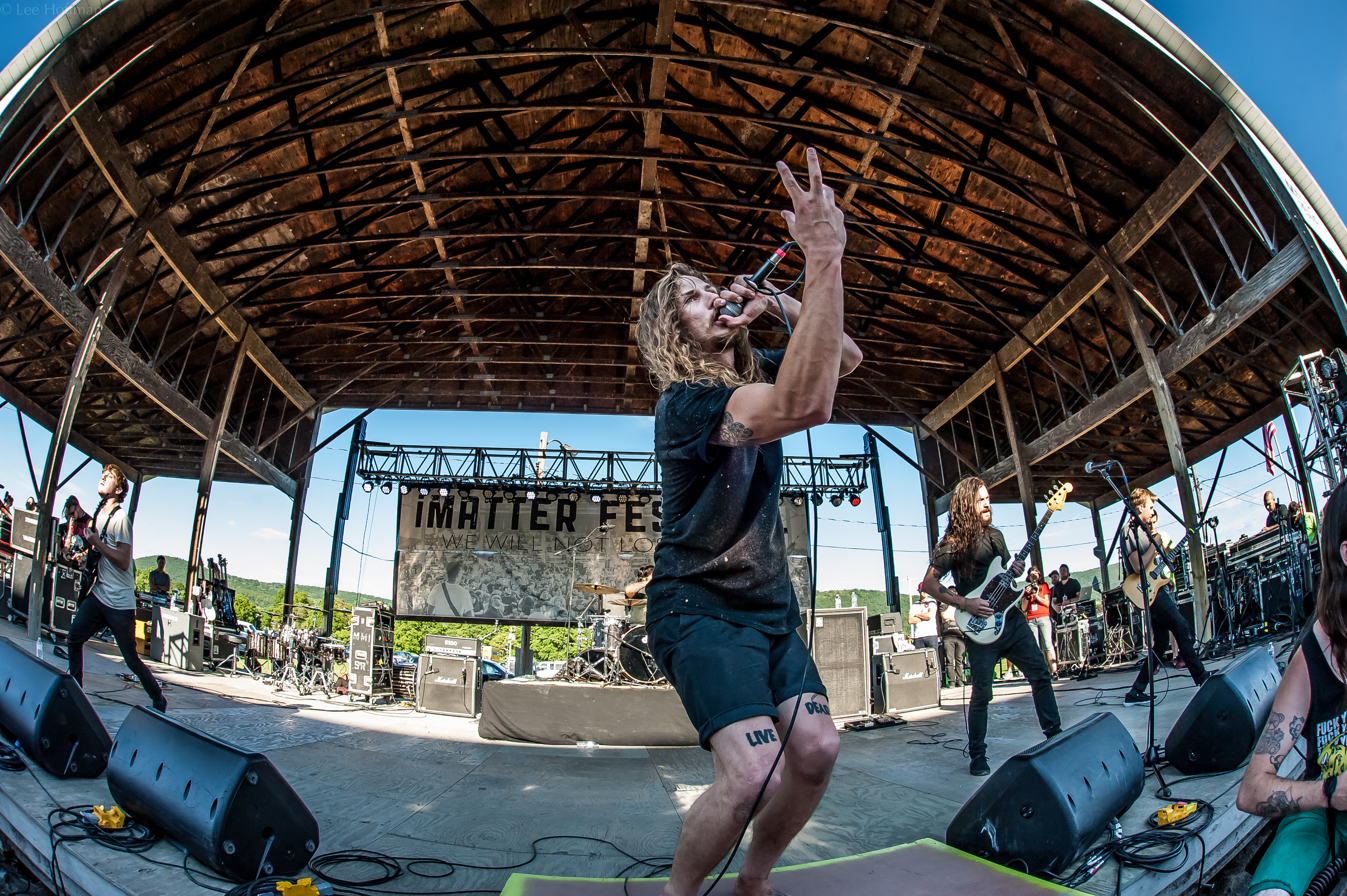
- Silent Planet performing live at the iMatter Festival in 2015

Background information
- Origin: Azusa, California, U.S.
- Genres: Metalcore; progressive metalcore; post-hardcore
- Years active: 2009–present
- Labels: Solid State; UNFD; Pure Noise
- Members: Garrett Russell; Mitchell Stark; Alex Camarena; Nick Pocock
- Past members: Nick Marshall; David "Ducky" Belvin; Jay Learue; Jason Scribner; Nathan Benedict; Garrett Lemster; Ryan Whittington; Teddy Ramirez; Igor Efimov; Spencer Keene; Thomas Freckleton
- Website: silentplanetmerch.com

Silent Planet is an American metalcore band formed in Azusa, California, in 2009. Their name is derived from C. S. Lewis' science fiction novel Out of the Silent Planet. The group consists of vocalist Garrett Russell, guitarist/clean vocalist Mitchell Stark, drummer Alex Camarena and bassist Nick Pocock. They are currently independent and have released five studio albums. Their latest studio album, Superbloom, was released on November 3, 2023.

== History ==
=== Formation, line-up changes and first releases (2009–2014) ===
Before finalizing the line-up for Come Wind, Come Weather, Silent Planet held practices in the Azusa Pacific University music building. They shared practice sessions with fellow hardcore band Hepafilter, in which Russell was also the lead vocalist. Russell recorded an EP titled Coward with Hepafilter and toured with them until the group disbanded in late 2011.

In 2012, the band recorded their first EP Come Wind, Come Weather in Atlanta, Georgia with producer Matt Goldman, which they released on May 15, 2012. Afterwards, the group toured with bands such as Becoming the Archetype, I, of Helix and Dayseeker while also played at California Metalfest 2012.

On February 14, 2013, Silent Planet released the song "Tiny Hands (Au Revoir)", which tells the story of Marguerite Rouffanche, survivor of the Oradour-sur-Glane massacre, an event that happened on June 10, 1944 during the Second World War. They continued touring and played on the Scream the Prayer Tour with bands like Wolves at the Gate and Fit for a King. On July 23, the band unveiled "Darkstrand (Hibakusha)", which, like "Tiny Hands (Au Revoir)", also tells the story of a World War II victim; this time the story is set in Japan just after the impact of the atomic bomb on Hiroshima.

On January 2, 2014, their five-track EP lastsleep (1944–1946), which is based on the stories of World War II victims, was released. It contains the two songs released in 2013 along with "Wasteland (Vechnost)", and two instrumentals. Later that year, they went on tour with bands such as Sleeping Giant, This or the Apocalypse, Phinehas, Those Who Fear, Lionfight and The Ongoing Concept.

=== The Night God Slept (2014–2015) ===
On May 17, 2014, Silent Planet unveiled that they completed their debut studio album. On July 13, band members also stated that the album is set to be released in fall 2014 through "an artist-friendly record label who is allowing [them] to retain full creative control." On September 14, the band revealed the release date of their record to be November 10, 2014. On September 19, they dropped a hint pointing towards the name of the album on their Facebook page.

On September 23, it was announced that their debut studio album, The Night God Slept, would be released through Solid State Records. The group then released some new songs from the record to their Facebook page, starting with "XX (City Grave)" on September 30, followed by "Native Blood" on October 23, "Firstwake" on November 2 and "Depths II" on November 5. On September 30, 2015, Efimov announced his departure from the band.

=== Everything Was Sound (2016–2017) ===
On April 27, 2016, Silent Planet announced on Vans Warped Tour their second studio album, Everything Was Sound, which was released on July 1, 2016. The band released three singles from the record with two of them are accompanying with music videos. "Panic Room" was available on May 12. "Psychescape", featuring Spencer Chamberlain of Underoath, was streaming on June 2. The third and final single, "Orphan", was unveiled on June 17.

On October 26, it was revealed that drummer Alex Camarena has formed a side-project called Nothing Left along with brothers Brandon and Ryan Leitru, formerly from the band For Today. The project also comprises Danon Saylor, the former vocalist of A Bullet for Pretty Boy and Devin Henderson of Take It Back!. They are planning to release new music by the end of the year through Nuclear Blast.

=== When the End Began (2018–2019) ===
On June 15, 2018, Silent Planet released "Northern Fires (Guernica)", which revolves around the Spanish Civil War. On July 17, they unveiled another single titled "Vanity of Sleep", which revolves around modern consumer despair. On August 7, the band announced their third studio album, When the End Began, which was released on November 2, 2018.

On August 17, the third single, "Share the Body", was available with a corresponding music video. On September 14, the group was streaming the fourth single "In Absence". On October 19, one month before the album release, the fifth and final single of the album ,"The New Eternity", came out. On August 18, 2019, the band released an additional song, "Shark Week", a B-side from this album's sessions.

=== Iridescent (2020–2022) ===
On January 24, 2020, Silent Planet released The Night God Slept Redux, a re-recorded edition of their debut album. On February 14, the band released "Trilogy", a single that focuses and revolves around vocalist Garrett Russell's stay in a mental hospital in which he wrote the lyrics in one sitting. On April 17, the band released the instrumental edition of the recent redux of The Night God Slept. On April 24, they released the instrumental edition of Everything Was Sound. On May 1, they released the instrumental edition of When the End Began.

On March 23, 2021, band members officially announced the new fourth album is completed. On April 9, after unveiling some artworks the prior couple days, they announced during the global COVID-19 pandemic a surprise collaboration with Fit for a King. The collaboration included both bands' vocalists being featured on reworked version of their recent tracks and both bands will also release a limited merch line to promote the collaboration.

On August 20, the group surprise released a brand new single "Panopticon". On September 17, Silent Planet officially unveiled the third single "Terminal" along with its music video. At the same time, the band revealed that their upcoming fourth album would be entitled Iridescent, with a release date of November 12, 2021, along with the cover and track list of the album. To promote the album, they also announced that they will support Motionless in White's rescheduled U.S. tour along with Light the Torch and Dying Wish which has started in May 2021. On October 22, one month before the album release, the group debuted the fourth single "Anhedonia".

=== Superbloom (2022–2024) ===
On July 22, 2022, Silent Planet's first single, ":Signal:", was debuted. On June 9, 2023, Thomas Freckleton announced that he had left the band due to wanting to spend more time with his family and having a fusion in his spine which had only gotten more painful over the years. Later, it was announced that the band's touring musician, Nick Pocock, would be their new bassist. On July 21, the band unveiled the second single "Antimatter" and its corresponding music video.

On August 24, the band published the third single "Collider" and an accompanying music video. Simultaneously, they officially announced that their fifth studio album, Superbloom, was set for release on November 3, 2023, whilst also revealing the album cover and the track list. The date holds significance for the band as, on that same date in 2022, they were involved in a serious tour van crash that severely injured Garrett Russell, whose dazed state partly inspired the album's creation.

On September 22, the band released the fourth single "Anunnaki" along with a music video. The music video for "Offworlder" was released November 3, 2023, coinciding with the album release.

On December 13th, 2024, the band released a new single, "Mindframe", complete with music video, whilst also announcing their independence from their longtime labels of Solid State and UNFD.

=== Bloom In Heaven EP with Invent Animate and Infinite Sleep (2025–present) ===
On January 15, 2025 Invent Animate took to Instagram with a post that said "BLOOM." Meanwhile, Silent Planet had a post that read "IN HEAVEN." Then, on January 21, both bands tagged one another in a post that read, "1.23//IA//SP. On Thursday as the clock resets to 00:00, an angel and an alien will meet in a graveyard called Earth. Return To One." Finally, on January 23, 2025, it was announced that a new single, 'Return To One' would be released, and that they would be releasing a collaboration 3-song EP titled 'Bloom In Heaven' with Invent Animate, on March 28, 2025.

On July 21, 2025 the band released a new single, "Wick", via their bandcamp and announced that all the proceeds would go to Return of Childhood, a charity organization seeking to benefit Ukrainian children. The official release and an accompanying music video followed on July 25. On December 12, the band again released another new single, "Under Your Skin" along with an accompanying music video, and which some fans had gotten to hear early on the band's own Patreon page.

On October 15, 2026, the band released a video across their social media platforms revealing the title of their upcoming sixth album, Infinite Sleep. On October 28, the band posted another video to their social media with secret code included in the captions revealing after fans deciphered it that a new single would be released on November 10. On November 9, it was revealed early via Apple Music that the new album would be released on January 29, 2027 via the band's new label they had now signed to, Pure Noise Records, along with the album's tracklisting and artwork, and on November 10 the new single, “fangs!!” featuring Jacob Charlton of Thornhill was released.

== Musical style and influences ==
Musically, Silent Planet has been described as metalcore, progressive metalcore, and post-hardcore. They are known for their intricate sound and incorporation of post-rock textures. The band has also been noted for their thought-provoking lyrics, which cover topics such as war, psychology, religion, and politics. Russell cites songs such as "No Place to Breathe" (in support of Black Lives Matter) and "Alive, as a Housefire" (confronting the ideological divide in the United States of America) as explicit statements of the band's political beliefs.

Band members have listed Oh, Sleeper, Architects, Underoath, This Will Destroy You, mewithoutYou, Oceana, Death Cab for Cutie, Brand New, System of a Down, Loathe, Tigran Hamasyan, Arca, My Epic, Scarypoolparty, Anderson .Paak and Paramore as influences on their sound.

== Christianity ==
Silent Planet have sometimes been labeled as Christian metal, due to their use of biblical references and some of the band members' faith, though they incorporate non-religious themes and references as well. In a 2019 interview with Metal Injection, Garrett Russell said:

"I'll tell you point blank for the record, we've never considered ourselves a Christian metal band and even the perception that we are a Christian metal band has definitely made our lives harder. We get passed up on tours because they don't want to be associated with us because of that label. I'm not ashamed of being called a Christian because I am a Christian and I'm open about that. However, our band doesn't feel like our songs only pertain to Christians both topically and lyrically. And I don't think you have a to be a Christian to understand our songs. If anything, we kinda get a backlash from Christians sometimes because we ask more questions than provide answers. A hallmark of typical Christian music is pretending to have answers. I don't pretend to have answers. I have ideas that I'm open to share about my life experiences and why I'm a Christian and what Jesus means to me because I love to do that, but I'm only interested in doing that if you're interested in doing that. I'm not really interested in making you interested in that. Not all the guys in my band are Christian either. We're super open about that. It is a good question and it comes up a lot. I've seen constantly that people don't want to hear our music because of the Christian label. I think it's a bummer that people are that closed off to music. Honestly, I love music too much. A band could be Satanist and I just want to hear the music. It's unfortunate that some people play that game."

== Band members ==
Current

- Garrett Russell – lead vocals, guitars (2020–present); unclean vocals (2009–2020)
- Alex Camarena – drums (2012–present)
- Mitchell Stark – guitars (2014–present); clean vocals (2020–present); keyboards (2023–present)
- Nick Pocock – bass, backing vocals (2023–present; touring member 2022–2023)

Former

- Nick Marshall – guitars, clean vocals (2009–2010)
- David "Ducky" Belvin – guitars (2010)
- Jay Learue – bass (2009–2010)
- Jason Scribner – drums (2009–2012)
- Teddy Ramirez – drums (2012)
- Nathan Benedict – guitars, keyboards (2009–2013)
- Ryan Whittington – guitars (2011–2013)
- Garrett Lemster – bass (2011–2014)
- Igor Efimov – guitars (2014–2015)
- Spencer Keene – guitars (2011–2016)
- Thomas Freckleton – drums (2012), guitar (2012-2014), keyboards, clean vocals (2013–2023), bass (2014-2023)

Timeline

== Discography ==
Studio albums

Year	Title	Label	Peak chart positions							
Year	Title	Label	US	US Rock	US Hard Rock	US Christ.	US Indie	US Album Sales	US Digital Albums	US Vinyl Albums
2014	The Night God Slept	Solid State	—	—	16	24	43	—	—	—
2016	Everything Was Sound	Solid State	85	7	1	1	4	22	20	19
2018	When the End Began	Solid State, UNFD	97	13	8	3	2	20	13	9
2021	Iridescent	Solid State, UNFD	—	—	—	—	—	—	—	—
2023	Superbloom	Solid State	—	—	—	—	—	—	—	—
2027	Infinite Sleep	Pure Noise	To be released							

EPs

- Come Wind, Come Weather (2012)
- Lastsleep (1944–1946) (2014)
- Bloom in Heaven (with Invent Animate) (2025)

Singles

- "Tiny Hands (Au Revoir)" (2013)
- "Darkstrand (Hibakusha)" (2013)
- "Panic Room" (2016)
- "Psychescape" (2016)
- "Orphan" (2016)
- "Northern Fires (Guernica)" (2018)
- "Vanity of Sleep" (2018)
- "Share the Body" (2018)
- "In Absence" (2018)
- "The New Eternity" (2018)
- "Shark Week" (2019)
- "Trilogy" (2020)
- "Panopticon" (2021)
- "Terminal" (2021)
- "Anhedonia" (2021)
- ":Signal:" (2022)
- "Antimatter" (2023)
- "Collider" (2023)
- "Anunnaki" (2023)
- "Mindframe" (2024)
- "Return to One" (with Invent Animate) (2025)
- "Wick" (2025)
- "Under Your Skin" (2025)
- "fangs!!" (feat. Jacob Charlton of Thornhill) (2026)
