= Graham Fenton (singer) =

English rockabilly singer (1947–2025)

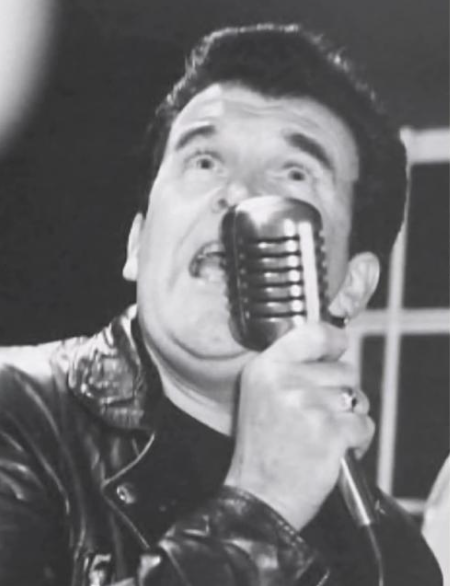

Background information
- Born: Graham Robert Rankine; 28 May 1947; Perivale, Ealing, England
- Died: 10 August 2025 (aged 78) Sandown, Isle of Wight, England
- Genres: Rockabilly; rock and roll
- Instrument: Vocals
- Years active: 1965-2025
- Labels: Magnet Records

Graham Robert Rankine (28 May 1947 – 10 August 2025), known professionally as Graham Fenton, was an English rockabilly singer, best known as the lead vocalist and frontman of the English rockabilly band Matchbox. With a career spanning several decades, Fenton was a prominent figure in the British rockabilly revival of the 1980s. In addition to his work with Matchbox, he also had a long solo career, collaborating with numerous rock and roll artists over the years such as Gene Vincent, Chuck Berry, and Bo Diddley.

== Early life ==
Graham Robert Rankine was born on 28 May 1947, in Perivale. He grew up in Hanwell, Ealing.

== Career ==
In the late 1960s, Fenton became vocalist for British rock and roll band The Houseshakers who backed Gene Vincent during two of his European tours (France and England) and following Vincent's death, performed Be-Bop-a-Lula as tribute to him at the London Rock and Roll Show in 1972, supporting other artists on the bill such as Chuck Berry, Bo Diddley, Bill Hayley and his Comets, and Little Richard.

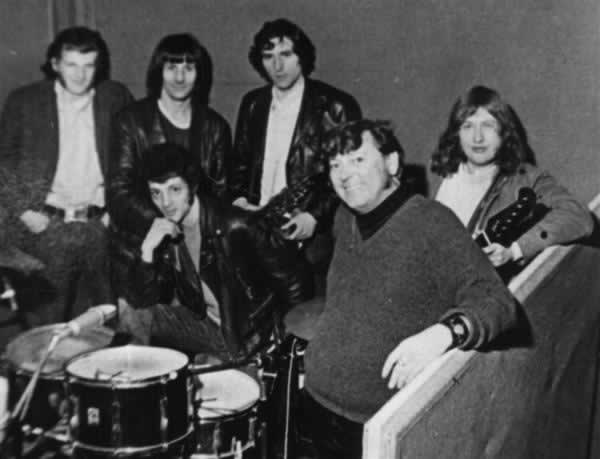
Fenton (top left) pictured with Gene Vincent & The Houseshakers in the recording studio, 1971

Fenton also features as lead vocals on The Houseshakers' LP Demolition Rock, released in 1972.

Following the disbandment of The Houseshakers, Fenton formed The Hellraisers who found moderate success.

After the Hellraisers split in 1976, Fenton joined Matchbox alongside Gordon Scott, Steve Bloomfield, Fred Poke, and Jimmy Redhead.

They achieved international fame, gaining wide chart successes and selling over five million records in Europe, Australia, New Zealand, and Scandinavia while also making numerous TV appearances and touring with country and rock and roll legends including Johnny Cash, Chuck Berry, and Jerry Lee Lewis.

Some of Fenton's most successful hits with Matchbox include "Rockabilly Rebel" (Bloomfield, 1979), "Midnite Dynamos" (Bloomfield, 1980), a cover of "When You Ask About Love" by The Crickets (their highest charting record at #4 in the UK charts), and a musical medley of "Over the Rainbow" (1980).

In 1989, following a decline in the success of Matchbox and their subsequent split, Fenton formed a new line-up, Graham Fenton’s Matchbox, featuring guitarist Iain Terry, drummer Bob Burgos, pianist Howard Gadd, and double bassist Greg Gadd. Throughout their tenure, they produced six albums and toured around Europe.

By 1996, Matchbox had reformed, reuniting the line-up from their peak years. Fenton continued to perform internationally with Matchbox until his death in August 2025.

In the 2010s, Fenton also released several solo albums such as A Rockabilly Legend, and Graham Fenton & Friends - a collaborative album produced alongside guitarist Darrel Higham and bassist Pete Pritchard.

== Death ==
Fenton died suddenly of a heart attack on 10 August 2025, aged 78.
