= The Houseshakers =

The Houseshakers were a British rock and roll band that formed at the end of 1969, and were active in the early 1970s. They backed Gene Vincent on two of his European visits. They performed in their own right and acted as the backing for Bo Diddley and Chuck Berry at The London Rock and Roll Show on 5 August 1972.

The line-up was Graham Fenton (vocals), Terry Clemson (lead guitar), Tommy Husky (sax), Jimmy Walls (bass), and Les Warren (drums).

Terry Clemson (as Terry Gibson) previously played in The Downliners Sect. Clemson and Fenton later formed the Hellraisers. Graham Fenton later joined Matchbox and died in 2025.

Tommy Husky (Huskisson) later joined Cadillac.

Clemson also led the TT's. He died in 2020.

== Recordings ==
- Demolition Rock (1972) Tracks: "Sea Cruise", "Miss Froggie", "Baby Blue", "Henrietta", "Lights Out", "Red Hot", "Bye Bye Johnny", "Flying Saucers Rock 'n' Roll", "Honey Hush", "Wild Cat", "My Way", "Brand New Cadillac" (Available on Contours Of Rock 'n' Roll Raucous Records which also contains The Hellraisers' Contours album from 1974 )

Line-up of the album Demolition Rock was Vocals – Graham Fenton, Guitar – Terry Clemson, Bass – Jimmy Walls, Drums – Les Warren, Saxophone – John Earl, it was produced by Eddie Bourne.

- The London Rock & Roll Show DVD ASIN: B00007LZ56 (performing "Be-Bop-a-Lula" in some releases of the disc, and seen backing Chuck Berry and Bo Diddley)
