= Shake It All About =

Shake It All About may refer to:

- Shake It All About (film), 2001 Danish film
- Shake It All About (album), 1992 children's music album by Little Richard
