= The King of Rock and Roll =

Studio album by Little Richard
- Released: October 1971
- Recorded: 25 May – 2 July 1971
- Genre: Rock; soul
- Length: 42:34
- Label: Reprise
- Producer: H.B. Barnum

Little Richard chronology
Mr. Big (1971)	The King of Rock and Roll (1971)	The Second Coming (1972)

Professional ratings
Review scores
Source	Rating
AllMusic	3.5/5 stars
The Encyclopedia of Popular Music	3/5 stars

The King of Rock and Roll is an album by Little Richard, released in 1971. It was his second album for Reprise Records. It was rereleased as part of the King of Rock and Roll: The Complete Reprise Recordings set.

== Production ==
The King of Rock and Roll was produced and arranged by H. B. Barnum. It contains one original Little Richard song, the gospel rock "In the Name", and a new song co-written by Barnum, "Green Power", the album's single. The rest of the tracks are covers. The title track is a mock braggadocio that references Tom Jones, Elvis Presley, Ike & Tina Turner, Sly and the Family Stone and Aretha Franklin, among others. The album title and cover art were inspired by Little Richard's image in the early 1970s, when he would often appear in public wearing robes, jewelry, and a crown.

== Critical reception ==
The album received a largely negative review in Rolling Stone, where Vince Aletti stated: "Much of the album seems designed around the Talk Show Personality rather than the Singer, giving it the sticky veneer of a jive extravaganza." Reviewing the album as part of the Reprise collection, The Austin Chronicle deemed it a "pandering covers concept."

== Track listing ==
1. "King of Rock 'n' Roll" (Bradford Craig, H.B. Barnum) – 3:11
2. "Joy to the World" (Hoyt Axton) – 6:49
3. "Brown Sugar" (Keith Richards, Mick Jagger) – 3:23
4. "In the Name" (Richard Penniman) – 3:10
5. "Dancing in the Street" (Marvin Gaye, William "Mickey" Stevenson) – 5:31
6. "Midnight Special" (Traditional; arranged by Richard Penniman) – 4:02
7. "The Way You Do the Things You Do" (Robert Rogers, William Robinson) – 3:29
8. "Green Power" (H.B. Barnum, John "Skip" Anderson) – 3:59
9. "I'm So Lonesome I Could Cry" (Hank Williams) – 2:40
10. "Settin' the Woods on Fire" (Ed G. Nelson, Fred Rose) – 2:22
11. "Born on the Bayou" (John C. Fogerty) – 4:27

== Personnel ==
- Little Richard – vocals, electric piano

Rest of personnel unknown, records not kept by Reprise.

== Charts ==
Chart (1971)	Peak position
US Billboard Top LPs	193
