= Little Richard Live =

Little Richard Live!

Studio album by Little Richard
- Released: 1976
- Recorded: August 1976
- Studio: Jack Clement Recording (Nashville, Tennessee)
- Genre: Rock and roll
- Label: K-Tel
- Producer: Stan Shulman

Little Richard chronology
| Talkin' 'bout Soul (1974) | Little Richard Live! (1976) | God's Beautiful City (1979) |

Little Richard Live! 20 Super Hits is a recording of a live-in-studio performance by Little Richard. Recorded at the Jack Clement Studio in Nashville before an audience, the album featured remakes of twenty of his Specialty Records tracks. Counting the live takes on this album, this was the second time that Richard had rerecorded his 1950s hits in studio. These August 1976 sessions and an early 1990s session with Japanese guitarist Masayoshi Takanakka are the last times that Penniman would re-record his 1950s hits for an album before his death in May 2020. Alternate takes from these sessions are found on a full stereo "Audiophile" album from 1980.

== History ==
Just prior to recording Little Richard Live!, Richard appeared in the film The London Rock and Roll Show and on piano for two tracks on the Bachman–Turner Overdrive album Head On. Richard was approached by Stan Shulman in 1976, and after negotiations Richard finally agreed to the sessions – he had already made his decision to leave rock and roll for the second time. After recording this album for K-Tel, Penniman did not return to a recording studio until 1979, where he recorded gospel music for the World label.

Penniman reflected on this during an interview for UK music show The Tube in 1985, where he told presenter Jools Holland, "I gave up rock and roll in 1976. I had a lot of death in my family, my brother fell dead, he had a heart attack, he was thirty-two years old. I had another friend who got shot in the head, another friend of mine got cut up with a butcher knife, another friend of mine had a heart attack, then my mother died. Then my nephew shot himself in the head, and so I decided I would just give my life to being an evangelist."

== Track listing ==
(some tracks have been issued as alternate takes)

1. "The Girl Can't Help It"
2. "Rip It Up"
3. "Send Me Some Lovin'"
4. "Bama Lama Bama Loo"
5. "She's Got It"
6. "Can't Believe You Wanna Leave"
7. "Long Tall Sally"
8. "Jenny, Jenny"
9. "Good Golly, Miss Molly"
10. "Lucille"
11. "Keep A-Knockin'"
12. "All Around the World"
13. "True Fine Mama"
14. "Ready Teddy"
15. "By the Light of the Silvery Moon"
16. "Slippin' and Slidin'"
17. "Baby Face"
18. "Ooh! My Soul"
19. "Miss Ann"
20. "Tutti Frutti"

== Personnel ==
- Little Richard – vocals, piano
- Dennis Brownside – piano
- Eddie Bayers – drums
- Jack Jackson – bass guitar
- Paul Worley – guitar
- Pat Patnik – guitar
- Don Jackson – saxophone

According to K-Tel Records, it is not known whether Richard also played piano on these tracks.
