= Pray Along with Little Richard (Vol 2) =

Pray Along With Little Richard (Volume 2)

Studio album by Little Richard
- Released: 1960
- Recorded: c. September 1959
- Genre: Gospel
- Label: End

Little Richard chronology
Pray Along with Little Richard (1959)	Pray Along With Little Richard (Volume 2) (1960)	The King of the Gospel Singers (1962)

Pray Along with Little Richard Volume 2 was the second gospel album by Little Richard, and his fifth album overall, discounting compilations.

== History ==
After recording this album, Richard returned to New York in 1960 to record his first rock 'n' roll tracks since 1957. Backed by his band The Upsetters, he recorded two singles for the Little Star label, with band members believing there was enough material for an entire album, though this cannot be confirmed. (page 218).

== Track listing ==
1. "Troubles of the World"
2. "Search Me Lord"
3. "Every Time I Feel The Spirit"
4. "I Know The Lord"
5. "Certainly Lord"
6. "Tell God My Troubles"
7. "I Want Jesus to Walk with Me"
8. "In My Heart"
9. "I'm Quittin' Show Business"
10. "I'm Quittin' Show Business (Part 2)"
