= Pump Girls =

American musical group

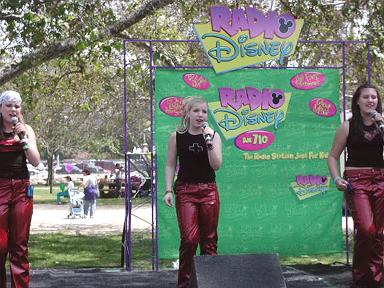

Background information
- Genre: Pop
- Past members: Brittany Rausch; Colleen Cottrell; Sara Cronstadt; Janelle Munion

The Pump Girls were a musical group which became popular in 1998. The group consisted of four girls who met through an organization for children with diabetes:

- Brittany Rausch (1998-2005)
- Colleen Cottrell (1998-2000)
- Sara Cronstadt (1998-2000)
- Janelle Munion (1998-1999)

All of the group's original members, and all but one of the subsequent members, were diagnosed with type 1 diabetes. The name of the group comes from a type of portable insulin pump which the girls would wear to help them manage their diabetes more easily. One of the goals of the group was to foster diabetes awareness and support by letting their peers see that they can still have a fun and active life while dealing with diabetes, promoting the idea that diabetes should never keep you from achieving your dreams.

The genesis of the group occurred around early 1997. The original members met through an organization at Children's Hospital of Orange County (CHOC) known as the PADRE Foundation (Pediatric Adolescent Diabetes Research and Education), which provides youth and their families with positive support, programs and services to assist in living with Type 1 Diabetes. At a PADRE support group meeting, Corrie Rausch (mother of group member Brittany) jokingly came up with the idea of the singing group as a parody of the Spice Girls, and wrote lyrics to a song they could perform. In February, at an annual winter family retreat sponsored by PADRE and the ADA (American Diabetes Association), the group performed the song in a sketch.

The performance attracted the attention of a pharmaceutical representative from diabetes pump manufacturer MiniMed Technologies (now part of Medtronic). MiniMed contacted PADRE director Jackie Teichmann with interest in having the group perform live, and ultimately financing an album/CD. Music producer H. B. Barnum of Little Star Records, a friend of Teichmann, expressed interest in helping the group by producing the CD. Barnum had already worked with performers such as Aretha Franklin, Puff Daddy and Barry White. In the spring of 1998 the Pump Girls had their public debut and CD launch at Children's Hospital Los Angeles (CHLA) with much media coverage. Shortly after releasing the CD, the group had more publicity and many high profile TV and live public performances, and partnered with the Walt Disney Company to begin touring at various Disney parks and Radio Disney events.

There have been a number of personnel changes over the years. The original incarnation of the group was to have included a fifth member, Jamie Khoury. Khory spent months rehearsing the songs and dance steps with the group, but she ultimately took the path to continue her education without the distraction of being in the group. More recent Pump Girls have included:

- Sarah Ann Carey (2000-2002, replaced Janelle Munion)
- Nicole Shiley Kukuruda (2000, replaced Sara Cronstadt & Colleen Cottrell)
- Debbie Lemus (2000-2005, replaced Nicole Shiley Kukuruda)
- Chelsea Unger (2002, replaced Sarah Ann Carey)
- Heather Faland (2003-2005 replaced Chelsea Unger)

While Chelsea Unger was the only member of the group who didn't have diabetes herself, she was supportive of her father in dealing with his own diabetes for which he wore the portable insulin pump.

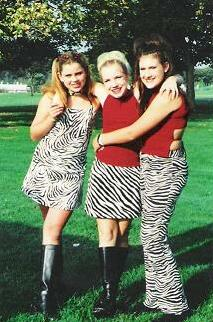
Pump Girls at a walk for Diabetes

The Pump Girls have been featured on CNN, ABC's World News Tonight with Peter Jennings, and various other media outlets. Originally from California, the group has toured throughout the United States. The Pump Girls have performed at events sponsored by Juvenile Diabetes Research Foundation, American Diabetes Association, American Association of Diabetes Educators, PADRE Foundation, and have had exposure on Radio Disney and the Disney Channel.

They have shared the stage with 1999 Miss America Nicole Johnson, who also has type 1 diabetes and is herself an advocate of diabetes awareness. Johnson mentioned the group in her 2001 autobiography Living with Diabetes: "The Pump Girls, a group of talented teens from Southern California, met at camp and formed a singing group. They all are "pumpers" like me and they are a huge inspiration to youngsters with diabetes — and adults, too!"

According to an archived version of the group's website (defunct as of 2010), the final event at which the group actively performed was the California School Nurses Annual Conference, Hollywood, February 2005.

The Pump Girls could possibly be confused with an unrelated group of the same name, also known as "DZ's Pump Girls", a Chicago hip house dance club group with two vinyl LP singles in the 1980s.
