= The King of the Gospel Singers =

Studio album by Little Richard
- Released: c. November 1961
- Recorded: c. June 1961
- Genre: Gospel
- Label: Mercury
- Producer: Quincy Jones

Little Richard chronology
Pray Along with Little Richard (Vol 2) (1960)	The King of the Gospel Singers (1961)	Little Richard Is Back (And There's a Whole Lotta Shakin' Goin' On!) (1964)

The King of the Gospel Singers is the sixth studio album by Little Richard. A gospel album from sessions he recorded for the Mercury Records label, it is generally regarded as being a better recording than his two albums with the Goldner label.

== History ==
The tracks making up the album were recorded in New York City with an approximate recording date of June 1961. Recalling the sessions, producer Quincy Jones noted: "I had the pleasure to record with Little Richard "Joy Joy Joy" and "He's Not Just A Soldier" for his albums [...] It was truly a joy working with Little Richard in New York; though he was still very religious I noticed that he never lost his feeling for Rock 'n' Soul."

A further twelve gospel tracks were recorded for the Mercury label at an unknown location in March 1962. Of these additional tracks, only two were released at the time, with "Change Your Ways"/"He Got What He Wanted" an April 1962 single, which scored in Europe. The remaining tracks were issued on a bootleg around 1980; then issued on an overseas CD around 2014, of undetermined provenance .

After this period Richard continued his commitment to gospel, recording eleven tracks for Atlantic Records between June 1962 and April 1963. Finally, he was enticed back into the rock 'n' roll genre full-time, during a tour of the UK. Soon after returning from that European tour, 24 November 1962, he cut six secular numbers for the Little Star label, under his band's name. He cut five or six tracks for Specialty Records between March and April 1964.

== Legacy ==
The King of the Gospel Singers would indirectly lead to the resurrection of Richard's rock 'n' roll career, as the touring schedule saw him sharing bills with The Beatles and become inspired by his old sound. Richard himself observed of the album that it was "the thing that really put me back in business. It was just the kind of music I had always wanted to record. After it was released the offers for gospel concerts started pouring in."

== Track listing ==
No.	Title	Writer(s)	Length
1.	"It's Real"	Homer L. Cox	3:17
2.	"Joy Joy Joy (Down in My Heart)"	Charles Hutchison Gabriel	2:17
3.	"Do You Care"	Wailin' Bill Dell	2:48
4.	"The Captain Calls for You"	A.W. Spaulding, Harold A. Miller	2:19
5.	"In Times Like These"	Ruth Caye Jones	3:26
6.	"Do Lord, Remember Me"	Quincy Jones, Richard Penniman	2:33
7.	"Ride On, King Jesus"	Quincy Jones, Richard Penniman	2:53
8.	"(There Will Be) Peace in the Valley (For Me)"	Thomas A. Dorsey	2:55
9.	"He's Not Just a Soldier"	Richard Penniman, William Pitt	2:36
10.	"My Desire"	Thomas A. Dorsey	3:00
11.	"He's My Star"	Richard Penniman	3:22
12.	"It Takes Everything to Serve The Lord"	Marshall Kelly, Samuel Bond	2:55

== Personnel ==
- Little Richard – vocals
- The Quincy Jones Orchestra
- The Howard Roberts Chorale
- Plus unknown instrumentalists
