= Little Richard Meets Masayoshi Takanaka =

Studio album by Little Richard and Masayoshi Takanaka
- Released: 1992
- Recorded: 1992
- Studio: A Cut Above (Nashville), Cherokee Studios, Studio Masters
- Genre: Rock and roll
- Label: Eastworld
- Producer: Joey Carbone; co-produced by Jesse Boyce

Little Richard and Masayoshi Takanaka chronology
Shake It All About (1992)	Little Richard Meets Masayoshi Takanaka (1992)	Southern Child (2005)

Little Richard Meets Masayoshi Takanaka is a collaborative album by American pianist, singer and performer Little Richard and Japanese musician and composer Masayoshi Takanaka. It is the final studio album of new recordings released by Richard before his death in 2020. Released on the Eastworld label in 1992, the record features re-recordings of some of Little Richard's biggest hits.

== Track listing ==
1. "Good Golly Miss Molly" – 3:42
2. "Tutti Frutti" – 3:39
3. "Miss Ann" – 4:43
4. "Lucille" – 3:49
5. "Long Tall Sally" – 3:30
6. "Send Me Some Lovin'" – 3:32
7. "Jenny, Jenny" – 3:09
8. "Rip It Up" – 3:10
9. "Kansas City / Hey Hey Hey Hey" – 3:52
10. "Ready Teddy" – 3:52
