= The London Rock and Roll Show (film) =

- 1975 U.S. release poster
- Directed by: Peter Clifton
- Produced by: Peter Clifton
- Starring: Bill Haley, Little Richard, Jerry Lee Lewis, Bo Diddley, Chuck Berry
- Narrated by: Mick Jagger
- Edited by: Thomas Schwalm
- Release date: 1973
- Running time: 84 minutes
- Country: United Kingdom
- Language: English

The London Rock and Roll Show is a 1973 British-produced concert film directed by Peter Clifton chronicling a Rock and Roll Revival concert held at Wembley Stadium in London, England in August 1972.

== Background ==
From the late 1960s to the early 1970s, many rock and roll performers from the 1950s experienced major career revivals due to a temporary upswing of interest in their form of music. The Revival was marked by a series of major concerts in the United States, and also spread to Europe where events such as the Wembley concert attracted thousands of fans who came out to see the performers behind the music.

London Rock and Roll Show begins with excerpts from numerous "warm-up" performers shown singing either covers of 1950s hits, or original tunes, including a performance by Screaming Lord Sutch that threatens to end the concert prematurely when he brings a stripper on stage.

The main concert segment begins with Bo Diddley and continues with a string of other major performers including Jerry Lee Lewis, Little Richard, and Bill Haley and His Comets. The concert ends with an extended performance by Chuck Berry, who at the time was enjoying major chart success in Britain and the US with his "My Ding-a-Ling" (although he does not perform that song in this film). Mick Jagger also appears in several non-musical interludes in which he is interviewed about the performers.

In 1975, the film was released in the U.S. by Richard Ellman Film Enterprises in Association with Aion Films in quadraphonic sound.

Although no soundtrack release occurred at the time the film was made, one was finally issued in the early 2000s, followed by several different DVD releases with different combinations of performances.

== Songs performed ==
The House Shakers

- "Be Bop A Lula"

Heinz

- "C'mon Everybody"

Screaming Lord Sutch and the Savages

- "Great Big Coffin"
- "Looking for Mary"

Bo Diddley

- "Road Runner"
- "Bring It to Jerome"
- "Mona"

A recording of "Peggy Sue" by Buddy Holly was played.

Jerry Lee Lewis

- "High School Confidential"
- "You Can Have Her"
- "Chantilly Lace"
- "Whole Lotta Shakin' Goin' On"
- "Medley: Hound Dog / Good Golly Miss Molly / Blue Suede Shoes / Whole Lotta Shakin' Goin' On"
- "Sweet Little Sixteen"

Bill Haley & His Comets

- "Shake, Rattle and Roll"
- "See You Later Alligator"
- "Rock Around the Clock" (plus encore)

Some DVD releases omit "Shake, Rattle and Roll".

Little Richard

- "Lucille"
- "Rip It Up"
- "Good Golly Miss Molly"
- "Tutti Frutti"
- "Jenny, Jenny"

Chuck Berry

- "School Days"
- "Memphis Tennessee"
- "Sweet Little Sixteen"
- "Let It Rock"
- "Mean Ole Frisco'"
- "Wee Wee Hours"
- "Medley: Oh Carol!/ Little Queenie"
- "Reelin' and Rockin'"

Several different DVD releases exist of this film, not all of which include the complete songlist, above. Additional performances were also recorded, but not included in the film.

== Reception ==
The film was praised by Jim Lowe and Paul Foster.

== See also ==
- The London Rock and Roll Show - the Wikipedia article on the festival itself
- Let the Good Times Roll, a similar American film released in 1973 and featuring many of the same artists, but this time filmed in concert in New York and Detroit.
- Sweet Toronto, a 1970 concert movie filmed in 1969 featuring performances by Bo Diddley, Jerry Lee Lewis, Little Richard and John Lennon and the Plastic Ono Band.
