= God's Beautiful City =

Studio album by Little Richard
- Released: 1979
- Recorded: 1979
- Genre: Gospel
- Label: Word

Little Richard chronology
Little Richard Live (1976)	God's Beautiful City (1979)	Lifetime Friend (1986)

God's Beautiful City is a gospel album by Little Richard, recorded at unknown dates in Nashville, 1979. Richard was inspired to record it due in part to the death of his brother.

After recording the album, Richard went on to record two unreleased tracks on June 17, 1981 – "One Day at a Time" and "Where Will I Go Without the Lord?" – before his career fell dormant once more. Some of the tracks have 1978 copyright dates to suggest a 1978 recording, though April 1979 has been reported.

== Reception ==
Professional ratings
Review scores
Source	Rating
AllMusic	2/5 stars

The album drew mixed reviews and sold poorly. The Encyclopedia of Contemporary Christian Music called the music "nondescript," while The New Rolling Stone Album Guide considered it unfortunate that the album had gone out of print.

== Track listing ==
Side one

1. "There Is Someone (Worse Off Than I Am)"
2. "If You Got the Lord on Your Side (Everything Will Be Alright)"
3. "It Is No Secret (What God Can Do)"
4. "I Surrender All"

Side two

1. "Little Richard's Testimony: 1) What Am I Supposed to Do Without Jesus"
2. "Little Richard's Testimony: 1) Come By Here, My Lord; 2) God's Beautiful City"

== Personnel ==
- Little Richard – piano, vocals

Plus unknown personnel on piano, bass, organ, vocals and drums.
