= Mr. Big (Little Richard album) =

Compilation album by Little Richard
- Released: 1971
- Recorded: c. December 1964 – c. 1965
- Genre: Soul
- Label: Joy (UK)

Little Richard chronology
The Rill Thing (1970)	Mr. Big (1971)	The King of Rock and Roll (1971)

Mr. Big, is a 1971 compilation album of songs by Little Richard. It includes the song "Dancin' All Around the World", recorded with guitarist Jimi Hendrix in the band. The song was a cover of "Dance When You Wanna", co-written by Sam Cooke and Clifton White.

Released in the middle of his Reprise Records period, Mr. Big was another compilation of Little Richard's mid-1960s recordings for Vee Jay Records, released on the UK Joy label. None of the tracks had previously been released on an album - many had been released on singles in 1965, the rest were previously unreleased . A later album with not only the same name, but also the same cover was released for the US market in 1974 with different tracks. (See The Alternate Mr. Big). Another similar release came in the form of Talkin‘ ‘bout Soul, also in 1974, with one previously unreleased track and stereo versions of released single sides.

== History ==
As covered on the entry for Little Richard Is Back (And There's A Whole Lotta Shakin' Goin' On!), Richard recorded nearly fifty tracks for the Vee-Jay Records label in 1964/1965. With the collapse of the record label, some of these tracks went unreleased until the 1970s.

== The Alternate Mr. Big ==
Three years after the release of this album, an album for the U.S. market was released using the same name, but with different tracks. The second Mr. Big album utilised the same cover, though is not included in the chronology as it contained nothing previously unreleased. The track listing on the US Mr. Big was as follows:

1. "Send Me Some Lovin'"
2. "Hound Dog"
3. "Whole Lotta Shakin' Goin' On"
4. "The Girl Can't Help It"
5. "Crossover"
6. "It Ain't What Ya Do"
7. "Everytime I Think About You"
8. "Dancin' All Around the World"
9. "Going Home Tomorrow"
10. "Money Honey"
11. "Ooh My Soul"

== Track listing ==
1. "Jenny, Jenny" (Enotris Johnson, Richard Penniman) (1:58)
2. "Without Love (There Is Nothing)" (Danny Small) (3:19)
3. "Cross Over" (Alvin Tyler) (2:40)
4. "My Wheel's Been Slippin' All the Way" (Richard Penniman) (2:26)
5. "It Ain't What You Do (It's the Way How You Do It)" (Anthony Codrington, Richard Penniman) (2:24)
6. "Every Time I Think About You" (Richard Penniman) (2:12)
7. "Talkin' 'Bout Soul" (J.W. Alexander) (2:10)
8. "I Don't Know What You Got (But It's Got Me) - Part 1" (Don Covay) (4:07)
9. "I Don't Know What You Got (But It's Got Me) - Part 2" (Harmony version) (Don Covay) (2.23)
10. "Dance What You Wanna" (J.W. Alexander, Sam Cooke, Clifton White) (2:23)
11. "Dancing All Around the World" (Richard Penniman) (2:57)

== Personnel, tracks 1, 3–5 ==
- Little Richard – vocals, piano
- Maurice James (Jimi Hendrix) – guitar

Rest of personnel unlisted in Vee Jay archives

== Personnel, tracks 2, 7 and 9 ==
- Little Richard – vocals, piano
- Clyde Johnson – saxophone
- William Green – saxophone
- Buddy Collette – saxophone
- Earl Palmer – drums
- Maurice James (Jimi Hendrix) – guitar cut 9
- Billy Preston – organ cut 9
- Ronny Miller – bass cut 9
- Bernard Purdie – drums cut 9
- Don Covay – harmony vocal cut 9

Rest of personnel unlisted in Vee Jay archives

== Personnel, tracks 6, 8 and 10 ==
- Little Richard – vocals, piano
- Jimi Hendrix – guitar
- Don Covay – harmony vocal
- Bernard Purdie – drums
- Ronny Miller – bass
- Billy Preston – organ

Rest of personnel unlisted in Vee Jay archive.
Above names relate to "I Don't Know What You've Got", "Dancin' All Around The World" and "You'd Better Stop".
"Every time I Think About You” is aka “Something Moves In My Heart"
