= Pray Along with Little Richard =

Studio album by Little Richard
- Released: 1960
- Recorded: c. September 1959
- Genre: Gospel
- Label: End

Little Richard chronology
The Fabulous Little Richard (1958/59)	Pray Along with Little Richard (1960)	Pray Along with Little Richard (Vol 2) (1960)

Pray Along with Little Richard is the fourth studio album, and first gospel album, by Little Richard. It was recorded during the period when he had renounced rock and roll and left the Specialty Records label. R&B star Richard Barrett drove Little Richard from Huntsville, Alabama to Manhattan, New York probably June, 1959, to sign a contract with George Goldner, on June 22.

== History ==
Since the songs were released over many different albums between 1959 and 1963, full details of these sessions have proved difficult to track down. In the book The Life and Times of Little Richard they are listed as being recorded in New York with an estimated date of September 1959. They were recorded for mogul George Goldner and the only known personnel member besides Richard was Herman Stevens on organ. The tracks were described by Charles White as "pretty miserable [...] 'dirgelike' cuts".

== Track listing ==
1. "Just a Closer Walk with Thee"
2. "Milky White Way" (3:22)
3. "Does Jesus Care?" (3:19)
4. "Jesus Walked This Lonesome Valley" (3:11)
5. "Coming Home" (2:49)
6. "I've Just Come from the Fountain" (1:49)
7. "I'm Trampin'" (2:47)
8. "Need Him" (2:33)
9. "God Is Real" (3:03)
10. "Precious Lord" (3:09)
