= Lifetime Friend =

Studio album by Little Richard
- Released: December 8, 1986
- Recorded: 1985–1986
- Studio: London, England
- Genre: Rhythm and blues; soul; rock and roll; contemporary Christian music
- Label: Warner Bros.
- Producer: Stuart Colman

Little Richard chronology
God's Beautiful City (1979)	Lifetime Friend (1986)	Shake It All About (1992)

Professional ratings
Review scores
Source	Rating
Allmusic	3/5 stars

Lifetime Friend is an album by Little Richard, released in 1986 and his first since the release of God's Beautiful City in 1979. Following that album's release and some 1981 recordings, backing tracks of which were used for TV appearances, Richard had made no recordings while he continued his career in the ministry. Following the release of his autobiography, The Quasar of Rock and Roll, in 1984, Richard reemerged in the public eye and had begun to be recognized for his contributions to popular music as one of the founders of rock and roll music.

Before Richard recorded Lifetime Friend, his mother, Leva Mae, had died; Richard had promised her that he would remain a Christian. For this album, he decided to mix his trademark rock and roll sound with gospel lyrics, in a style that he called "message music" or "messages in rhythm". One track, "I Found My Way", co-written by Richard and one of his young proteges Victor Brooks ll, included a blend of rap vocals and rock and roll. The album was recorded mainly in England, and was issued on WEA in Europe and Warner Bros. Records in the United States.

The song, "Great Gosh A'Mighty", co-written by Richard and Billy Preston, was released as a single after being featured on the soundtrack to Down and Out in Beverly Hills. It peaked at number 42 on the Billboard Hot 100 in April 1986, and number 36 in Canada. The version on this album has slightly altered lyrics. The song "Operator" was also a chart maker overseas.

== Track listing ==
1. "Great Gosh A'Mighty" (Billy Preston, Richard Penniman) – 4:48
2. "Operator" (Jesse Boyce) – 4:52
3. "Somebody's Comin'" (John David) – 3:40
4. "Lifetime Friend" (Jesse Boyce, Travis Wammack) – 3:38
5. "Destruction" (Jesse Boyce, Travis Wammack) – 3:45
6. "I Found My Way" (Victor L. Brooks ll, Richard Penniman) – 3:40
7. "The World Can't Do Me" (Jesse Boyce, Richard Penniman) – 3:48
8. "One Ray of Sunshine" (Darrell Smith, Travis Wammack) – 4:42
9. "Someone Cares" (Richard Penniman) – 4:30
10. "Big House Reunion" (Travis Wammack) – 4:05
