= Rappin' Duke =

Single by Rappin' Duke (aka Shawn Brown)

from the album ¿Que Pasa?
- B-side: "Rappin' Duke" (Instrumental) (6:20)
- Released: 1984
- Genre: Hip hop
- Length: 6:09
- Label: JWP Records
- Songwriters: Shawn Brown, Greg Brown
- Producer: H. B. Barnum

Rappin' Duke (aka Shawn Brown) singles chronology
"Rappin' Duke" (1984)	"Duke is Back" (1986)

"Rappin' Duke" is a 1984 hip-hop novelty song by Shawn Brown performing as the Rappin' Duke. It is the sixth track on Brown's 1985 album ¿Que Pasa?. The premise of the song is that actor, John Wayne, nicknamed The Duke, is rapping.

== History ==
The track debuted on a San Diego radio station in 1984, becoming widely played locally and eventually peaking at 73 on the 1985 Hot R&B/Hip-Hop Songs Billboard chart; and also charting on the Hot Dance Music/Maxi-Singles Sales for 1985. The song's success led to Brown opening in 1985 and 1986 for such artists as Bobby Brown and Stevie Wonder.

Brown signed with Tommy Boy Records after the album ¿Que Pasa? ran its course on the charts.

== Description and analysis ==
"Rappin' Duke"'s lyrics parody the hip hop bragging style popular at the time, wherein the rapper boasts of seniority, superior rhymes and flow in performance. The song uses the hip hop vernacular to make numerous pop cultural references from contemporary hip hop musicians such as Kurtis Blow and Run-DMC, to parodying the opening of Chaka Khan's 1984 hit "I Feel for You", replacing references to Khan with Aretha Franklin. The lyrics also reference The Beverly Hillbillies TV theme song "The Ballad of Jed Clampett", while also alluding to the presidency of Ronald Reagan. The song's constant refrain is "duh-ha, duh-ha", a parody of Wayne's distinctive laughter, sung to the music's slow beat.

The video opens with an African-American cowboy alternately walking and back-sliding onscreen with a boombox propped on his shoulder, obscuring his face. He is replaced by various images from old cowboy movies: gun battles, rope tricks, and the like, as well as other assorted images vaguely connected with the song lyrics. Halfway through the song, the cowboy — his facial features always hidden — reappears poolside, together with a trio of swimsuit-clad women. He shows them a few tricks, including moonwalking in his cowboy boots, and then ends up in the pool with the girls. The video fades out with the cowboy staggering into the sunset.

== References in media ==
The Notorious B.I.G. references "Rappin' Duke" in his 1994 hit single, "Juicy," rapping, "Remember Rappin' Duke? Duh-ha, duh-ha / You never thought that hip hop would take it this far."

== Charts ==
Chart (1985)	Peak position
U.S. Billboard Hot R&B/Hip-Hop Songs	73
