= The London Rock and Roll Show =

1972 concert in London, England

The London Rock and Roll Show was a concert held at Wembley Stadium in Wembley Park, London, England, on 5 August 1972. It is often said to have been the first ever concert held at the stadium, but a rock concert featuring the bands Status Quo and Yes had been held as part of the Oxfam Walk 1969 charity event at the stadium on 13 July 1969.

From the late 1960s to the early 1970s, many rock and roll performers from the 1950s experienced major career revivals due to a temporary upswing of interest in their form of music. The revival was marked by a series of major concerts in the United States, and also spread to Europe where events such as the Wembley concert attracted thousands of fans who came out to see the performers behind the music.

The concert included performances by major stars including Bo Diddley, Jerry Lee Lewis, Little Richard, and Bill Haley and His Comets. The concert ended with an extended performance by Chuck Berry, who at the time was enjoying major chart success in Britain and the US with his "My Ding-a-Ling".

Originally billed rock and roll era acts The Platters, The Drifters and The Coasters were unable to perform due to work permit issues. The show was opened instead with sets from British rock and rollers The Houseshakers, Joe Brown, Emile Ford & the Checkmates, Screaming Lord Sutch, Heinz (backed by Wilko Johnson and John Sparks from Dr. Feelgood) and Billy Fury; as well as songs from Jerry Lee Lewis's sister Linda Gail Lewis.

Roy Wood's new band Wizzard, only formed a few weeks previously, also made their live debut at the show.

Garage rockers MC5 were unpopular with the crowd. Little Richard got booed when he stopped singing and jumped on top of his piano. Gary Glitter and The Glitter Band were also booed.

Mick Jagger attended the concert, but did not perform.

The concert was filmed and released in 1973 as The London Rock and Roll Show, directed by Peter Clifton. Future Sex Pistols manager Malcolm McLaren can be seen selling T-shirts from a stall in the film. Although no soundtrack release occurred at the time the film was made, one was finally issued in the early 2000s (decade), followed by several different releases with different combinations of performances.

== Songs performed ==
Note: this list is not complete and accounts for only those performances included in the concert film.

The Houseshakers

- "Be-Bop-A-Lula"

Heinz

- "C'mon Everybody"

Screaming Lord Sutch and the Savages

- "Great Big Coffin"
- "Looking for Mary"

Bo Diddley

- "Road Runner"
- "Bring It To Jerome"
- "Mona"

Jerry Lee Lewis

- "High School Confidential"
- "You Can Have Her"
- "Whole Lotta Shakin' Goin' On"
- "Medley: "Hound Dog" / "Good Golly, Miss Molly" / "Blue Suede Shoes" / "Whole Lotta Shakin' Goin' On"
- "Sweet Little Sixteen"

Bill Haley & His Comets

- "Shake, Rattle and Roll"
- "See You Later, Alligator"
- "Rock Around the Clock" (plus encore)

Little Richard

- "Lucille"
- "Rip It Up"
- "Good Golly, Miss Molly"
- "Tutti Frutti"
- "Jenny, Jenny"

Chuck Berry

- "School Days"
- "Memphis Tennessee"
- "Sweet Little Sixteen"
- "Mean Ole Frisco'"
- "Wee Wee Hours"
- "Carol"
- "Little Queenie"
- "Reelin' and Rockin'"
