= Little Star Records =

Little Star Records was an independent label that was founded by music industry veteran H. B. Barnum in 1961.

Among the artists that recorded for the label include Jimmy Cavallo, The O'Jays and Little Richard, who recorded under the pseudonym, "The World Famous Upsetters", marking his first non-gospel recordings since 1957 on the label.

The label folded in 1963.
