= Little Richard =

American musician (1932–2020)

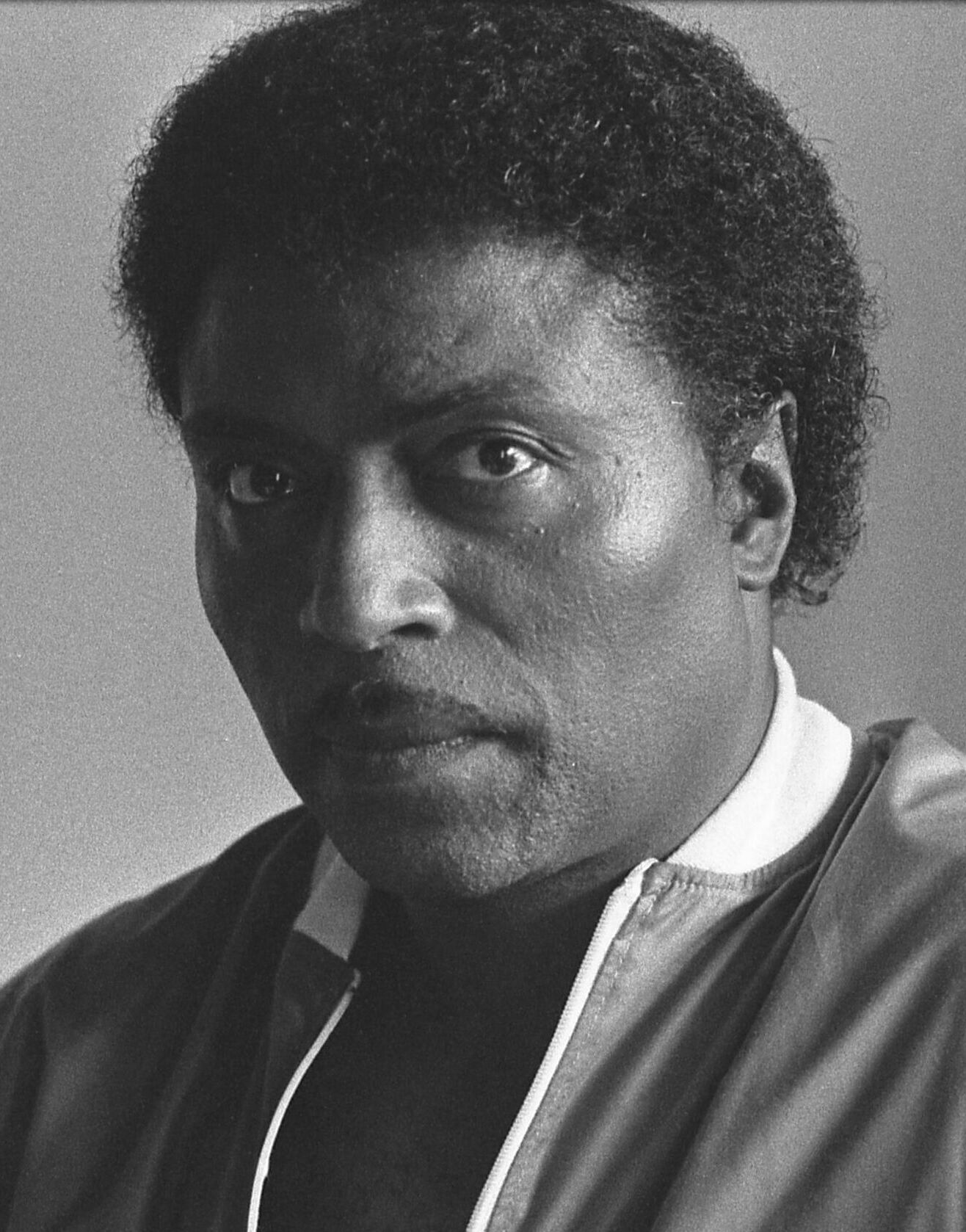
- Little Richard, 1984
- Born: Richard Wayne Penniman; December 5, 1932; Macon, Georgia, U.S.
- Died: May 9, 2020 (aged 87); Tullahoma, Tennessee, U.S.
- Resting place: Oakwood University Memorial Gardens
- Education: Oakwood College
- Occupations: Singer; pianist; songwriter; minister
- Years active: 1947–2020
- Spouse: Ernestine Harvin (m. 1959; div. 1964)
- Children: 1
- Musical career
- Genres: Rock and roll; rhythm and blues; gospel; soul
- Instruments: Vocals; piano
- Works: Little Richard discography
- Labels: RCA Victor; Peacock; Specialty; End; Ronnex; London; Goldisc; Little Star; Mercury; Atlantic; Capitol; Vee-Jay; Modern; Okeh; Brunswick; Reprise; K-Tel; WBR; WDR; Apple; Manticore

Richard Wayne Penniman (December 5, 1932 – May 9, 2020), better known by his stage name Little Richard, was an American singer, pianist and songwriter. He was an influential figure in popular music and culture for seven decades. Referred to as the "Architect of Rock and Roll", Richard's most celebrated work dates from the mid-1950s, when his charismatic showmanship and dynamic music, characterized by frenetic piano playing, pounding backbeat and powerful raspy vocals, laid the foundation for rock and roll. Richard's innovative emotive vocalizations and uptempo rhythmic music played a key role in the formation of other popular music genres, including soul and funk. He influenced singers and musicians across musical genres and his music helped shape rhythm and blues for generations.

"Tutti Frutti" (1955) became a hit, crossing over to the pop charts in the United States and the United Kingdom. His next hit single, "Long Tall Sally" (1956), hit No. 1 on the Billboard Rhythm and Blues Best-Sellers chart, followed by a rapid succession of fifteen more in less than three years. In 1962, after a five-year period during which Richard abandoned rock and roll music for born-again Christianity, concert promoter Don Arden persuaded him to tour Europe. During this time, the Beatles opened for Richard on some tour dates.

Richard is cited as one of the first crossover black artists, reaching audiences of all races. His music and concerts broke the color line, drawing black and white people together despite attempts to sustain segregation. Many of his contemporaries, including Elvis Presley, Buddy Holly, Bill Haley, Jerry Lee Lewis, the Everly Brothers, Gene Vincent, Pat Boone, and Eddie Cochran, recorded covers of his works.

Richard was honored by many institutions. He was inducted into the Rock and Roll Hall of Fame as part of its first group of inductees in 1986. He was also inducted into the Songwriters Hall of Fame. He was the recipient of Lifetime Achievement Awards from The Recording Academy and the Rhythm and Blues Foundation. In 2015, Richard received a Rhapsody & Rhythm Award from the National Museum of African American Music. "Tutti Frutti" was included in the National Recording Registry of the Library of Congress in 2009, which stated that his "unique vocalizing over the irresistible beat announced a new era in music."

== Early life ==
Richard Wayne Penniman was born in Macon, Georgia, on December 5, 1932, the third of twelve children of Leva Mae (née Stewart) and Charles "Bud" Penniman. His father was a church deacon and a brick mason, who sold bootlegged moonshine on the side and owned a nightclub called the Tip in Inn. His mother was a member of Macon's New Hope Baptist Church. Initially, his first name was supposed to have been "Ricardo", but an error switched it to "Richard". The Penniman children were raised in Macon's Pleasant Hill neighborhood. In childhood, he was nicknamed "Lil' Richard" by his family because of his small and skinny frame. He was a mischievous child who played pranks on neighbors. He began singing in church and taking piano lessons at a young age. Possibly as a result of complications at birth, he had a slight deformity that left one of his legs shorter than the other. This produced an unusual gait, and he was mocked for his effeminate appearance.

His family was religious and joined various A.M.E., Baptist, and Pentecostal churches, with some family members becoming ministers. He enjoyed the Pentecostal churches the most, because of their charismatic worship and live music. He later recalled that people in his neighborhood sang gospel songs throughout the day during segregation to keep a positive outlook, because "there was so much poverty, so much prejudice in those days". He had observed that people sang "to feel their connection with God" and to wash their trials and burdens away. Gifted with a loud singing voice, he recalled that he was "always changing the key upwards" and that he was once stopped from singing in church for "screaming and hollering" so loud, earning him the nickname "War Hawk". As a child, he would "beat on the steps of the house, and on tin cans and pots and pans, or whatever" while singing, which annoyed neighbors.

His initial musical influences were gospel performers such as Brother Joe May, Sister Rosetta Tharpe, Mahalia Jackson, and Marion Williams. May, a singing evangelist who was known as "the Thunderbolt of the Middle West" because of his phenomenal range and vocal power, inspired Richard to become a preacher. He credited the Clara Ward Singers for one of his distinctive hollers. Richard attended Macon's Hudson High School, where he was a below-average student. He eventually learned to play alto saxophone, joining his school's marching band in fifth grade. While in high school, he got a part-time job at Macon City Auditorium for local secular and gospel concert promoter Clint Brantley. He sold Coca-Cola to crowds during concerts of star performers of the day such as Cab Calloway, Lucky Millinder, and his favorite singer, Sister Rosetta Tharpe.

== Music career ==
=== 1947–1955: Beginnings ===
In October 1947, Sister Rosetta Tharpe overheard the fourteen-year-old Richard singing her songs before a performance at the Macon City Auditorium. She invited him to open her show. After the show, Tharpe paid him, inspiring him to become a professional performer. In 1949, he began performing in Doctor Nubillo's traveling show. Richard was inspired to wear turbans and capes in his career by Nubillo, who also "carried a black stick and exhibited something he called 'the devil's child'—the dried-up body of a baby with claw feet like a bird and horns on its head." Nubillo told Richard he was "gonna be famous".

Before entering the tenth grade, Richard left his family home and joined Hudson's Medicine Show in 1949, performing Louis Jordan's "Caldonia". Richard recalled that the song was the first secular R&B song he learned since his family had strict rules against playing R&B music, which they considered "devil music". Other sources also indicate that Little Richard was influenced by Jordan. In fact, according to one reliable source, the whoop sound on Jordan's record "Caldonia" sounds eerily like the vocal tone Little Richard would adopt in addition to the "Jordan-style pencil-thin mustache".

Richard also performed in drag during this time, performing under the name "Princess LaVonne". In 1950, Richard joined his first musical band, Buster Brown's Orchestra, where Brown named him Little Richard. Performing in the minstrel show circuit, Richard, in and out of drag, appeared for vaudeville acts such as Sugarfoot Sam from Alabam, the Tidy Jolly Steppers, the King Brothers Circus, and the Broadway Follies. Having settled in Atlanta at this point, Richard began listening to rhythm and blues and frequented Atlanta clubs, including the Harlem Theater and the Royal Peacock, where he saw performers such as Roy Brown and Billy Wright onstage. Richard was further influenced by Brown's and Wright's flashy showmanship and even more so by Wright's flamboyant persona. Inspired by Brown and Wright, he decided to become a rhythm-and-blues singer. After befriending Wright, he began to learn how to be an entertainer from him, and began adapting a pompadour hairdo similar to Wright's, wearing flashier clothes, and using Wright's brand of pancake makeup.

Impressed by his singing voice, Wright put him in contact with Zenas Sears, a local DJ. Sears recorded Richard at his station, backed by Wright's band. The recordings led to a contract that year with RCA Victor. Richard recorded a total of eight sides for RCA Victor, including the blues ballad, "Every Hour", which became his first single and a hit in Georgia. The release of "Every Hour" improved his relationship with his father, who began regularly playing the song on his nightclub jukebox. Shortly after the release of "Every Hour", Richard was hired to front Perry Welch and His Orchestra and played at clubs and army bases for $100 a week. Richard left RCA Victor in February 1952 after his records failed to chart; the recordings were marketed with little promotion, although ads for the records showed up in Billboard.

After his father's death in 1952, Richard began to find success through RCA Victor's reissue of the recordings on the budget RCA Camden label. He continued to perform during this time and Clint Brantley agreed to manage Richard's career. Moving to Houston, he formed a band called the Tempo Toppers, performing as part of blues package tours in Southern clubs such as Club Tijuana in New Orleans and Club Matinee in Houston. Richard signed with Don Robey's Peacock Records in February 1953, recording eight sides, including four with Johnny Otis and his band that were not released at that time. Like his venture with RCA Victor, none of his Peacock singles charted, despite his growing reputation for high energy antics onstage. Richard began complaining of monetary issues with Robey, leading Robey to knock him out during a scuffle.

Disillusioned by the record business, Richard returned to Macon in 1954. Struggling with poverty, he settled for work as a dishwasher for Greyhound Lines. While in Macon, he met Esquerita, whose flamboyant onstage persona and dynamic piano playing would deeply influence Richard's approach. That year, he disbanded the Tempo Toppers and formed a harder-driving rhythm and blues band, the Upsetters, which included drummer Charles Connor and saxophonist Wilbert "Lee Diamond" Smith that toured under Brantley's management. The band supported R&B singer Christine Kittrell on some recordings, then began to tour successfully, even without a bassist, forcing drummer Connor to thump "real hard" on his bass drum to get a "bass fiddle effect". In 1954, Richard signed on to a Southern tour with Little Johnny Taylor.

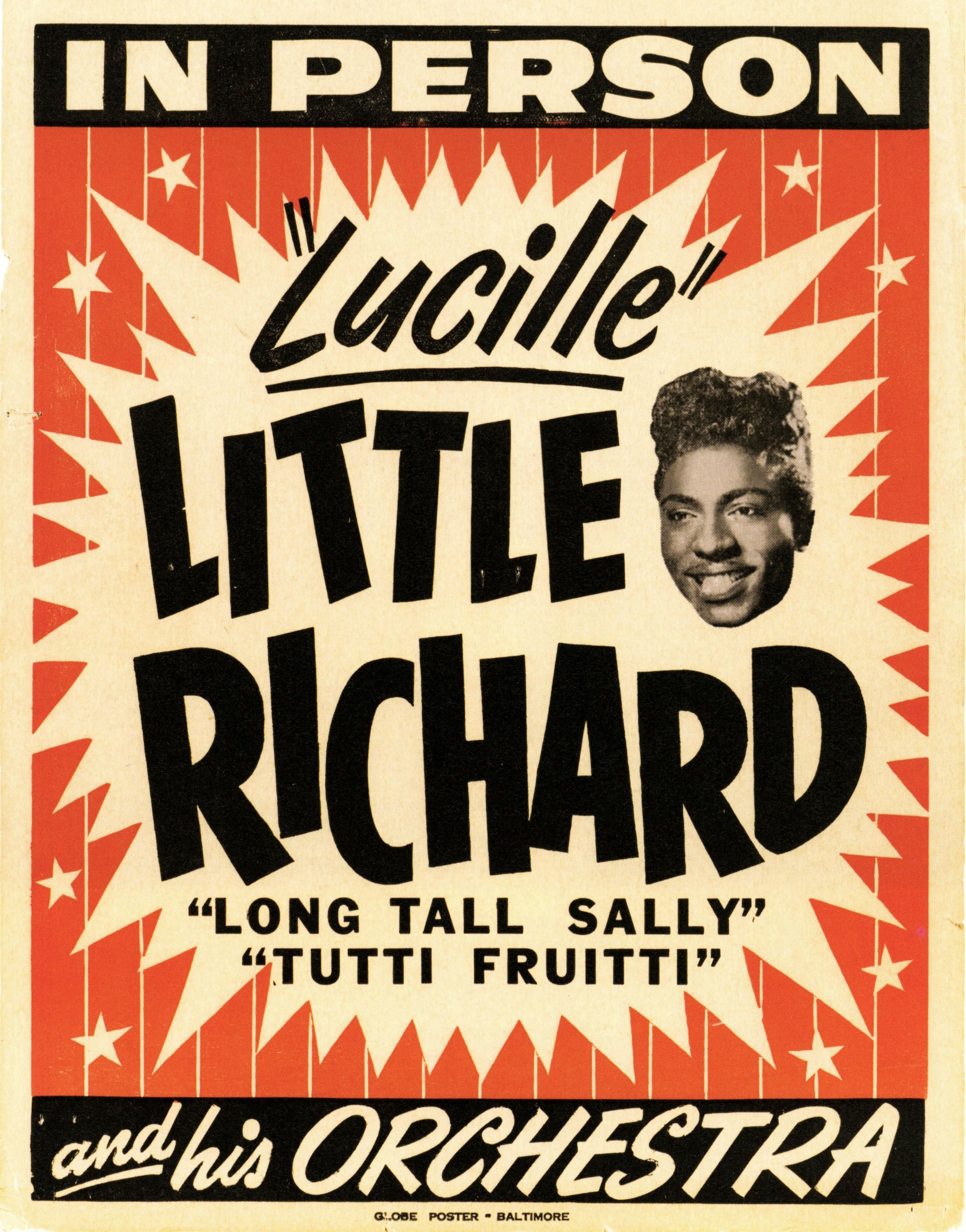
A poster for a Little Richard show, c. 1956

At the suggestion of Lloyd Price, Richard sent a demo to Price's label, Specialty Records, in February 1955. Months passed before Richard got a call from the label. Finally, in September of that year, Specialty owner Art Rupe loaned Richard money to buy out his Peacock contract and set him to work with producer Robert "Bumps" Blackwell. Upon hearing the demo, Blackwell felt Richard was Specialty's answer to Ray Charles, however, Richard told him he preferred the sound of Fats Domino. Blackwell sent him to New Orleans where he recorded at Cosimo Matassa's J&M Studios, recording there with several of Domino's session musicians, including drummer Earl Palmer and saxophonist Lee Allen. Richard's recordings that day failed to produce much inspiration or interest (although Blackwell saw some promise).

Frustrated, Blackwell and Richard went to relax at the Dew Drop Inn nightclub. According to Blackwell, Richard then launched into a risqué dirty blues he titled "Tutti Frutti". Blackwell said he felt the song had hit potential and hired songwriter Dorothy LaBostrie to replace some of Richard's sexual lyrics with less controversial ones. Recorded in three takes in September 1955, "Tutti Frutti" was released as a single that November and became an instant hit, reaching No. 2 on Billboard magazine's Rhythm and Blues Best-Sellers chart and crossing over to the pop charts in both the United States and the United Kingdom. It reached No. 21 on the Billboard Top 100 in America and No. 29 on the British singles chart, eventually selling a million copies.

=== 1956–1962: Initial success and conversion ===
A lot of songs I sang to crowds first to watch their reaction. That's how I knew they'd hit.

— Little Richard

Richard's next hit single, "Long Tall Sally" (1956), hit number one on the R&B chart and number 13 on the Top 100, while reaching the top 10 in Britain. Like "Tutti Frutti", it sold more than a million copies. Following his success, Richard built up his backup band, The Upsetters, with the addition of saxophonists Clifford "Gene" Burks and leader Grady Gaines, bassist Olsie "Baysee" Robinson and guitarist Nathaniel "Buster" Douglas. Richard began performing on package tours across the United States. Art Rupe described the differences between Richard and a similar hitmaker of the early rock and roll period by stating that, while "the similarities between Little Richard and Fats Domino for recording purposes were close", Richard would sometimes stand up at the piano while he was recording, and that onstage, where Domino was "plodding, very slow", Richard was "very dynamic, completely uninhibited, unpredictable, wild. So the band took on the ambience of the vocalist." Richard's high-energy antics included lifting his leg while playing the piano, climbing on top of his piano, running on and off the stage and throwing souvenirs to the audience. He also began using capes and suits studded with multi-colored stones and sequins. Richard said he became more flamboyant onstage so no one would think he was "after the white girls".

Richard's performances, like most early rock and roll shows, resulted in integrated audience reaction during an era where public places were divided into "white" and "colored" domains. In these package tours, Richard and other artists such as Fats Domino and Chuck Berry would enable audiences of both races to enter the building, albeit still segregated (e.g. blacks on the balcony and whites on the main floor). As his later producer H. B. Barnum explained, Richard's performances enabled audiences to come together to dance. Despite broadcasts on television from local supremacist groups such as the North Alabama White Citizens Council warning that rock and roll "brings the races together", Richard's popularity was helping to shatter the myth that black performers could not successfully perform at "white-only venues" especially in the South, where racism was most overt.

Richard claims that a show at Baltimore's Royal Theatre in June 1956 led to women throwing their undergarments onstage at him, resulting in other female fans repeating the action, saying it was "the first time" that had happened to any artist. Richard's show would stop several times that night to restrain fans from jumping off the balcony and then rushing to the stage to touch him.

Overall, Richard produced seven singles in the United States alone in 1956, with five of them also charting in the UK, including "Slippin' and Slidin'", "Rip It Up", "Ready Teddy", "The Girl Can't Help It" and "Lucille". Immediately after releasing "Tutti Frutti", "safer" white recording artists such as Pat Boone covered the song, charting in the top twenty, higher than Richard's. His fellow rock and roll peers Elvis Presley and Bill Haley also recorded his songs later that same year. Befriending Alan Freed, the disc jockey eventually put him in his "rock and roll" movies such as Don't Knock the Rock and Mister Rock and Roll. Richard was given a larger singing role in the film, The Girl Can't Help It. That year, he scored more hit success with songs such as "Jenny, Jenny" and "Keep A-Knockin'", the latter becoming his first top ten single on the Billboard Top 100. By the time he left Specialty in 1959, Richard had scored a total of nine top-40 pop singles, as well as seventeen top-40 R&B singles.

On September 2, 1956, Richard performed at the twelfth Cavalcade of Jazz, held at Wrigley Field in Los Angeles, which was produced by Leon Hefflin, Sr. Also performing that day were Dinah Washington, The Mel Williams Dots, Julie Stevens, Chuck Higgins' Orchestra, Bo Rhambo, Willie Hayden & Five Black Birds, The Premiers, Gerald Wilson and His 20-Pc. Recording Orchestra, and Jerry Gray and his Orchestra.

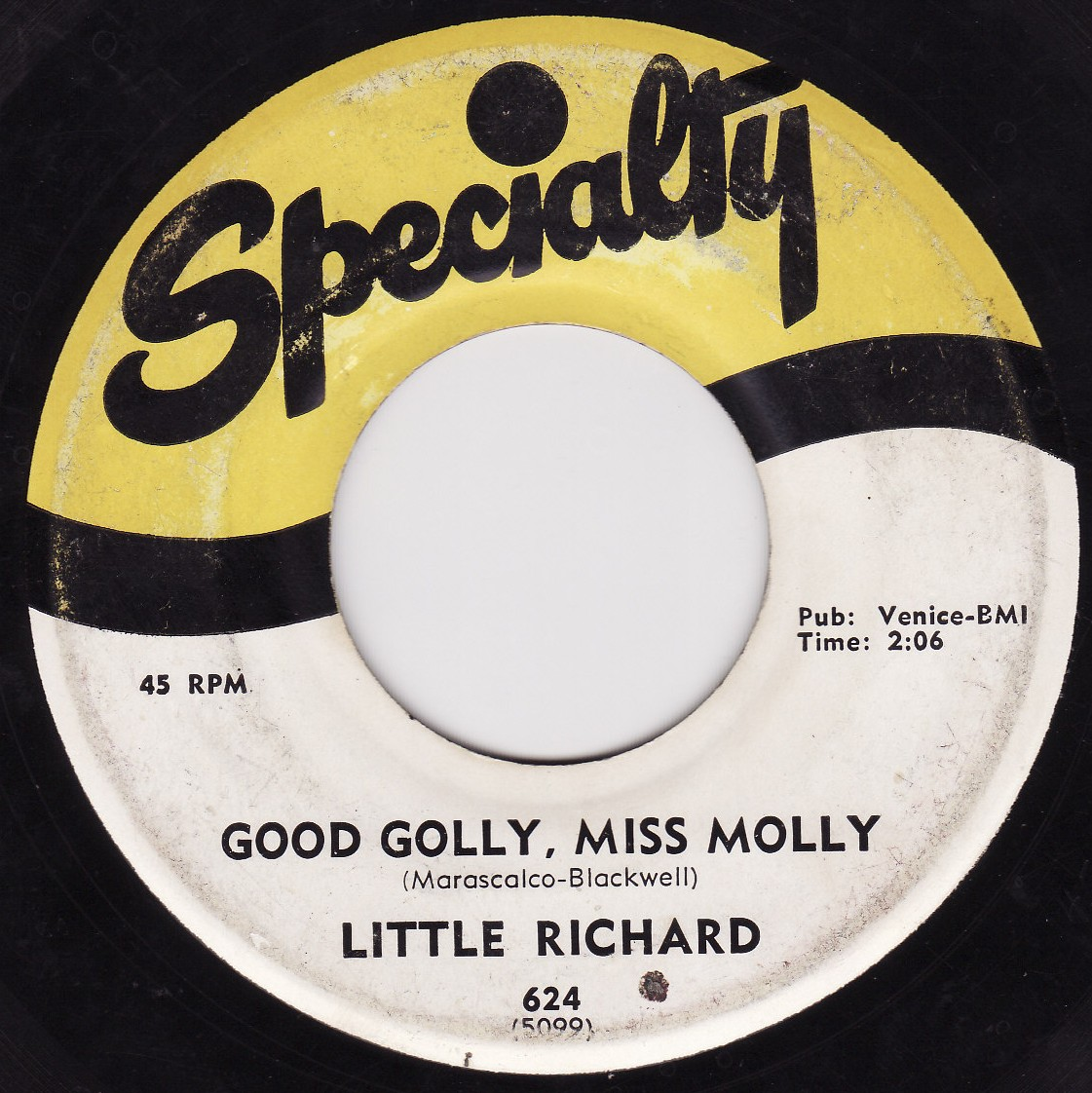
"Good Golly, Miss Molly", 45 rpm recording on Specialty Records

Shortly after the release of "Tutti Frutti", Richard relocated to Los Angeles. After achieving success as a recording artist and live performer, Richard moved into a wealthy, formerly-predominantly-white neighborhood, living close to black celebrities such as boxer Joe Louis. Richard's first album, Here's Little Richard, was released by Specialty in March 1957 and peaked at number thirteen on the Billboard Top LPs chart. Similar to most albums released during that era, the album featured six released singles, as well as "filler" tracks. In October 1957, Richard embarked on a package tour in Australia with Gene Vincent and Eddie Cochran. In the middle of the tour, he shocked the public by announcing he was following a life in the ministry. In early 1958, Specialty released his second album, Little Richard, which did not chart.

Richard claimed in his autobiography that, during a flight from Melbourne to Sydney, while his plane was experiencing some difficulty, he saw the plane's red-hot engines, and felt angels were "holding it up". At the end of his Sydney performance, Richard saw a bright red fireball flying across the sky above him and claimed he was "deeply shaken". Though he was eventually told that it was the first artificial Earth satellite Sputnik 1, Richard took it as a "sign from God" to stop performing secular music and repent for his wild lifestyle.

Returning to the States ten days earlier than expected, Richard later read news of his original flight having crashed into the Pacific Ocean, and took it as a further sign to "do as God wanted". After a "farewell performance" at the Apollo Theater and a "final" recording session with Specialty later that month, Richard enrolled at Oakwood College in Huntsville, Alabama, to study theology. Despite his claims of spiritual rebirth, Richard later admitted his reasons for leaving were more monetary. During his tenure at Specialty, despite earning millions for the label, Richard complained that he did not know the label had reduced the percentage of royalties he was to earn for his recordings. Specialty continued to release Richard's recordings, including "Good Golly, Miss Molly", and his unique version of "Kansas City", until 1960. Ending his contract with the label, Richard agreed to relinquish royalties for his material.

In 1958, Richard formed the Little Richard Evangelistic Team, traveling across the country to preach. A month after his decision to leave secular music, Richard met Ernestine Harvin, a secretary from Washington, D.C., and the couple married on July 11, 1959. Richard ventured into gospel music, first recording for End Records, where he released Pray Along with Little Richard and a second volume of the same title. In 1961, he signed with Mercury Records, where he eventually released King of the Gospel Singers, in 1962, produced by Quincy Jones, who later remarked that Richard's vocals impressed him more than any other vocalist he had worked with. His childhood heroine, Mahalia Jackson, wrote in the liner notes of the album that Richard "sang gospel the way it should be sung". While Richard was no longer charting in the U.S., with pop music, some of his gospel songs such as "He's Not Just a Soldier" and "He Got What He Wanted", and "Crying in the Chapel", reached the pop charts in the U.S. and the UK.

=== 1962–1979: Return to secular music ===
I heard so much about the audience reaction, I thought there must be some exaggeration. But it was all true. He drove the whole house into a complete frenzy ... I couldn't believe the power of Little Richard onstage. He was amazing.

— Mick Jagger

In 1962, concert promoter Don Arden persuaded Little Richard to tour Europe after telling him his records were selling well there. With soul singer Sam Cooke as an opening act, Richard, who featured a teenage Billy Preston in his gospel band, figured it was a gospel tour and, after Cooke's delayed arrival forced him to cancel his show on the opening date, performed only gospel material during the show, leading to boos from the audience expecting Richard to sing his rock and roll hits. The following night, Richard viewed Cooke's well-received performance. Bringing back his competitive drive, Richard and Preston warmed up in darkness before launching into "Long Tall Sally", resulting in frenetic, hysterical responses from the audience. A show at Mansfield's Granada Theatre ended early after fans rushed the stage.

Hearing of Richard's shows, Brian Epstein, manager of the Beatles, asked Don Arden to allow his band to open for Richard on some tour dates, to which he agreed. The first show for which the Beatles opened was at New Brighton's Tower Ballroom that October. The following month they, along with Swedish singer Jerry Williams and his band The Violents, opened for Richard at the Star-Club in Hamburg. During this time, Richard advised the group on how to perform his songs and taught Paul McCartney his distinctive vocalizations. Back in the United States, Richard recorded six rock and roll songs with his 1950s band, the Upsetters for Little Star Records, under the name "World Famous Upsetters", hoping this would keep his options open in maintaining his position as a minister.

In the fall of 1963, Richard was called by a concert promoter to rescue a sagging tour featuring The Everly Brothers, Bo Diddley and the Rolling Stones. Richard agreed and helped to save the tour from flopping. At the end of that tour, Richard was given his own television special for Granada Television titled The Little Richard Spectacular. The special became a ratings hit and after 60,000 fan letters, was rebroadcast twice. In 1964, now openly re-embracing rock and roll, Richard released "Bama Lama Bama Loo" on Specialty Records. Due to his UK exposure, the song reached the top twenty there but only hit 82 in the U.S. Later in the year, he signed with Vee-Jay Records, then on its dying legs, to release his "comeback" album, Little Richard Is Back. Due to the arrival of the Beatles and other British bands as well as the rise of soul labels such as Motown and Stax Records and the popularity of James Brown, Richard's new releases were not well promoted or well received by radio stations. However, his first Vee Jay album made number 136 on a major chart. In November/December 1964, Jimi Hendrix joined Richard's Upsetters band as a full member.

In December 1964, Richard brought Hendrix and childhood friend and piano teacher Eskew Reeder to a New York studio to re-record an album's worth of his greatest hits. He went on tour with his new group of Upsetters, to promote the album. In early 1965, Richard took Hendrix and Billy Preston to a New York studio where they recorded the Don Covay soul ballad, "I Don't Know What You've Got (But It's Got Me)", which became a number 12 R&B hit. Three other songs were recorded during the sessions, "Dance a Go Go" aka "Dancin' All Around the World", "You Better Stop", and "Come See About Me" (possibly an instrumental), but "You Better Stop" was not issued until 1971 and "Come See About Me" has yet to see official release. Around this time, Richard and Jimi appeared in a show starring Soupy Sales at the Brooklyn Paramount, New York. Richard's flamboyance and drive for dominance reportedly got him thrown off the show.

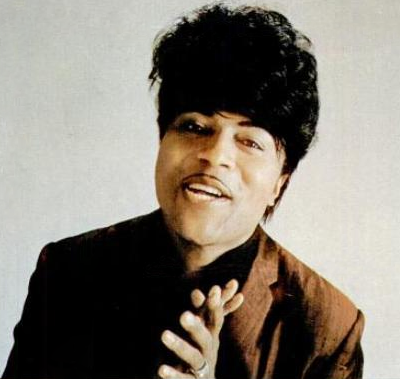
Little Richard in 1966

Hendrix and Richard clashed over the spotlight, as well as Hendrix's tardiness, wardrobe and stage antics. Hendrix also complained over his pay. In early July 1965, Richard's brother Robert Penniman "fired" Jimi, however, Jimi wrote to his father, Al Hendrix, that he quit Richard as "you can't live on promises when you're on the road, so I had to cut that mess aloose". Hendrix had not been paid "for five-and-a-half weeks" and was owed 1,000 dollars. Hendrix then rejoined the Isley Brothers' band, the IB Specials. Richard later signed with Modern Records, releasing a modest charter, "Do You Feel It?" before leaving for Okeh Records in early 1966. His former Specialty labelmate Larry Williams produced two albums for Richard on Okeh - the studio release The Explosive Little Richard, which used a Motown-influenced sound and produced the modest charters "Poor Dog" and "Commandments of Love" and Little Richard's Greatest Hits: Recorded Live! which returned him to the album charts. Richard was later scathing about this period, declaring Larry Williams "the worst producer in the world". In 1967, Richard signed with Brunswick Records, but after clashing with the label over musical direction, he left the following year.

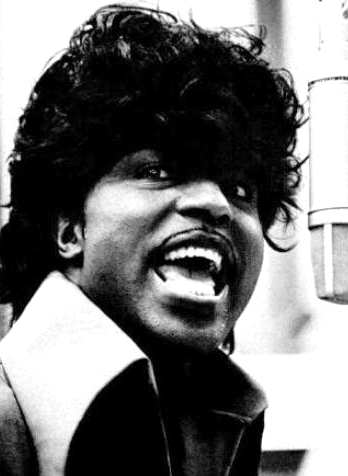
Little Richard in 1967

Richard felt that producers on his labels did not promote his records during this period. Later, he claimed they kept trying to push him to make records similar to Motown and felt he was not treated with appropriate respect. Richard often performed in dingy clubs and lounges with little support from his label. While Richard managed to perform in huge venues overseas such as in England and France, in the U.S. Richard had to perform on the Chitlin' Circuit. Richard's flamboyant look, while a hit during the 1950s, failed to help his labels to promote him to more conservative black record buyers. Richard later claimed that his decision to "backslide" from his ministry, led religious clergymen to protest his new recordings. Making matters worse, Richard said, was his insistence on performing in front of integrated audiences at the time of the black liberation movement, which caused many black radio disk jockeys in certain areas of the country, including Los Angeles, to choose not to play his music. Now acting as his manager, Larry Williams convinced Richard to focus on his live shows. By 1968, he had ditched the Upsetters for his new backup band, the Crown Jewels, and performed on the Canadian TV show, Where It's At. Richard was also featured on the Monkees TV special 33⅓ Revolutions per Monkee in April 1969. Williams booked Richard shows in Las Vegas casinos and resorts, leading Richard to adopt an even wilder, flamboyant, and androgynous look, inspired by Hendrix's success. Richard was soon booked at rock festivals such as the Atlantic City Pop Festival where he stole the show from headliner Janis Joplin. Richard produced a similar show stealer at the Toronto Rock and Roll Revival with John Lennon as the headliner. These successes brought Little Richard to talk shows such as the Tonight Show Starring Johnny Carson and the Dick Cavett Show, raising his celebrity status.

Responding to his reputation as a successful concert performer, Reprise Records signed Richard in 1970 and he released the album, The Rill Thing, with the philosophical single, "Freedom Blues", becoming his biggest single in years. In May 1970, Richard made the cover of Rolling Stone magazine. Despite the success of "Freedom Blues", none of Richard's other Reprise singles charted with the exception of "Greenwood, Mississippi", a swamp rock original by guitar hero, Travis Wammack, who incidentally played on the track. It charted briefly on the Billboard Hot 100, Cash Box pop chart, and Billboard Country charts. It made a strong showing on WWRL radio in New York. "Freedom Blues" reached #70 in Canada.Richard became a featured guest instrumentalist and vocalist on recordings by acts such as Delaney and Bonnie, Joey Covington and Joe Walsh and was prominently featured on Canned Heat's 1972 hit single, "Rockin' with the King". To keep up with his finances and bookings, Richard and three of his brothers formed a management company, Bud Hole Incorporated. By 1972, Richard had entered the rock and roll revival circuit, and that year, he co-headlined the London Rock and Roll Show at Wembley Stadium with Chuck Berry. When he came on stage he announced himself "the king of rock and roll", also the title of his 1971 album. He was booed during the show when he climbed on top of his piano and stopped singing; he also seemed to ignore the crowd. To make matters worse, he showed up with just five musicians and struggled through low lighting and bad microphones. When the concert film documenting the show came out, his performance was considered generally strong, though his fans noticed a drop in energy and vocal artistry. Two songs he performed did not make film's final cut. The following year, he recorded a charting soul ballad, "In the Middle of the Night", released with proceeds donated to victims of tornadoes that had caused damage in twelve states.

Richard did no new recordings in 1974, although two "new" albums were released. In the summer, came a major surprise for fans, Talkin' 'bout Soul, a collection of previously released Vee Jay recordings, as well as some unreleased numbers, all never before available on a domestic LP. Two were new to the world: the title tune and "You'd Better Stop", both up tempo.

Later that year came a set recorded in one night, early the previous year, called Right Now!, and featuring "roots" material, including a vocal version of an unreleased Reprise instrumental "Mississippi", released in 1972 as "Funky Dish Rag"; his third try at his gospel-rock tune "In the Name"; and a six-minute plus rocker, "Hot Nuts", based upon a 1936 song by Lil Johnson ("Get 'Em from the Peanut Man (Hot Nuts)").

1975 was a big year for Richard, with a world tour and acclaim over high energy performances throughout England and France. His band was perhaps his best to date. He cut a top 40 single (US and Canada), with Bachman-Turner Overdrive, "Take It Like a Man". He worked on new songs with sideman Seabrun "Candy" Hunter. In 1976, he decided to retire again, physically and mentally exhausted, having experienced family tragedy and the drug culture. He was talked into once again recutting his greatest hits, for Stan Shulman in Nashville. This time, they used original arrangements. Richard re-recorded eighteen of his hits for K-Tel Records in stereo, with a single featuring the new versions of "Good Golly Miss Molly" and "Rip It Up" reaching the UK singles chart. Richard later admitted that at the time he was addicted to alcohol and other drugs.

By 1977, worn out from years of drug abuse and wild partying as well as a string of personal tragedies, Richard quit rock and roll again and returned to evangelism, releasing one gospel album, God's Beautiful City, in 1979. At the same time, while touring as a minister and returning to talk shows, a controversial album was released by the discount label, Koala, taken from a 1974 concert. It includes an 11-minute discordant version of "Good Golly, Miss Molly". The performances are widely panned as subpar, and it gained notoriety among collectors.

=== 1984–1999: Comeback ===
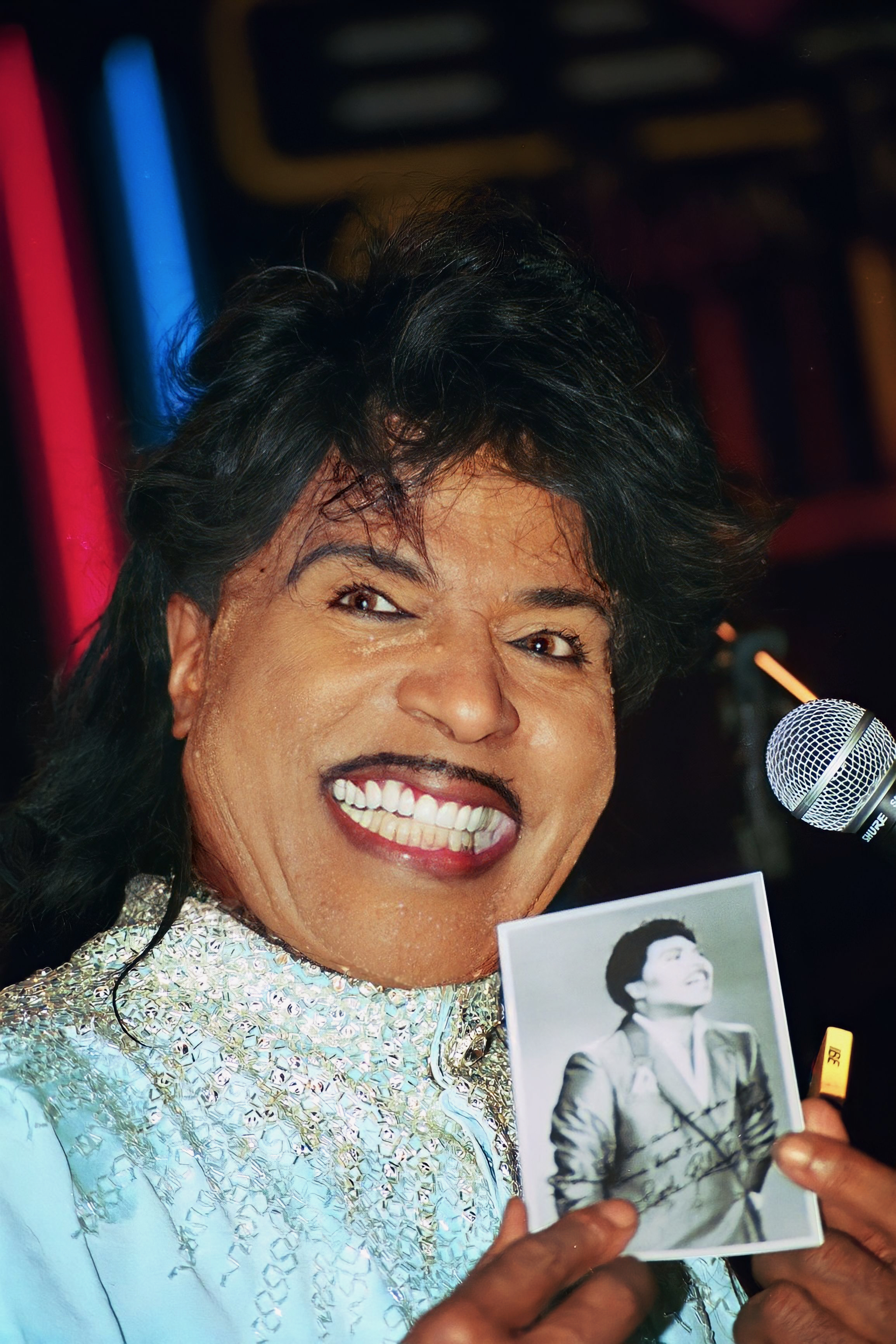
Little Richard holding a photograph of himself at a Best Buddies International event, 1998

In 1984, Richard filed a $112 million lawsuit against Specialty Records, Art Rupe and his publishing company, Venice Music, and ATV Music for not paying royalties to him after he left the label in 1959. The suit was settled out of court in 1986. According to some reports, Michael Jackson allegedly gave him monetary compensation for his work, which he co-owned with Sony-ATV, songs by the Beatles and Richard. In September 1984, Charles White released the singer's authorized biography, Quasar of Rock: The Life and Times of Little Richard, which returned Richard to the spotlight. Richard returned to show business in what Rolling Stone referred to as a "formidable comeback" following the book's release.

Reconciling his roles as evangelist and rock and roller for the first time, Richard stated that the genre could be used for good or evil. After accepting a role in the film Down and Out in Beverly Hills, Richard and Billy Preston penned the faith-based rock and roll song "Great Gosh A'Mighty" for its soundtrack. Richard won critical acclaim for his film role and the song found success on the American, Canadian (#36), and British charts. The hit led to the release of the album Lifetime Friend (1986) on Warner Bros. Records, with songs deemed "messages in rhythm", including a gospel rap track. In addition to a version of "Great Gosh A'Mighty", cut in England, the album featured two singles that charted in the UK, "Somebody's Comin'" and "Operator". Richard spent much of the rest of the decade as a guest on television shows and appearing in films, winning new fans with what was referred to as his "unique comedic timing."

In 1988, he introduced a new song written by his guitarist, Travis Wammack ("King of the Swamp Guitar"), "(There's ) No Place Like Home", a slow, reflective biographical Country ballad, which fans believed would become a major Country hit. It was performed at major musical events and captured on a commercial video from Italy and released in an Australian DVD. (Seven years later, a single was pressed but withdrawn. Richard discovered it was bootlegged.) That same year, he surprised fans with a tribute to Otis Redding at his Rock and Roll Hall of Fame induction ceremony, singing several Redding songs, including "Fa Fa Fa Fa Fa (Sad Song)", "These Arms of Mine", and "(Sittin' on the) Dock of the Bay". Richard told Redding's story and explained how his 1956 tune "All Around the World" was Redding's reference on his 1963 side, "Hey, Hey Baby". In 1989, Richard provided rhythmic preaching and background vocals on the extended live version of the U2–B.B. King hit "When Love Comes to Town". That same year, Richard returned to singing his classic hits following a performance of "Lucille" at an AIDS benefit concert.

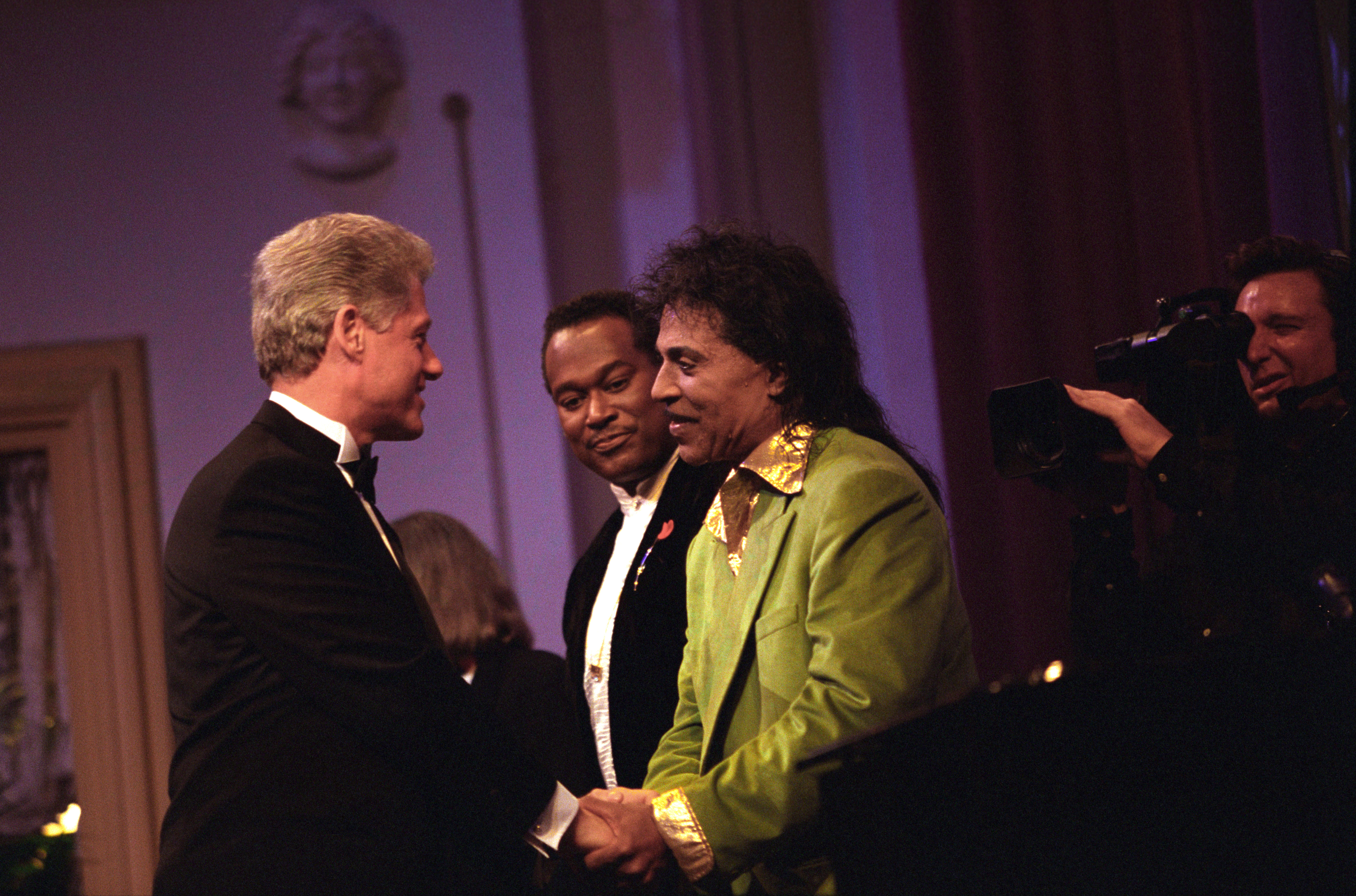
President Bill Clinton greets Little Richard at the White House in 1994

In 1990, Richard contributed a spoken-word rap on Living Colour's hit song, "Elvis Is Dead", from their album Time's Up. That same year he appeared in a cameo for the music video of Cinderella's "Shelter Me". In 1991, he appeared the home video Detonator Videoaction 1991 by the hair metal band Ratt, and the same year, he was one of the featured performers on the hit single and video "Voices That Care" that was produced to boost the morale of U.S. troops involved in Operation Desert Storm. The same year, he recorded a version of "The Itsy Bitsy Spider" for the Pediatric AIDS Foundation benefit album For Our Children. The album's success led to a deal with Walt Disney Records, resulting in the release of a hit 1992 children's album, Shake It All About.

In 1994, Richard sang the theme song to the award-winning PBS Kids and TLC animated television series The Magic School Bus. He also opened Wrestlemania X from Madison Square Garden that year miming to his reworked rendition of "America the Beautiful".

Throughout the 1990s, Richard performed around the world and appeared on TV, film, and tracks with other artists, including Jon Bon Jovi, Elton John, and Solomon Burke. In 1992 he released his final album, Little Richard Meets Masayoshi Takanaka, featuring members of Richard's touring band.

=== 2000–2020: Later years ===
In 2000, Richard's life was dramatized for the biographical film Little Richard, which focused on his early years, including his heyday, his religious conversion and his return to secular music in the early 1960s. Richard was played by Leon Robinson, who earned an NAACP Image Award nomination for his performance. In 2002, Richard contributed to the Johnny Cash tribute album, Kindred Spirits: A Tribute to the Songs of Johnny Cash. In 2004–2005, he released two sets of unreleased and rare cuts, from the Okeh label 1966/67 and the Reprise label in 1970/72. Included was the full Southern Child album, produced and composed mostly by Richard, scheduled for release in 1972, but shelved. In 2006, Little Richard was featured in a popular GEICO advertisement.

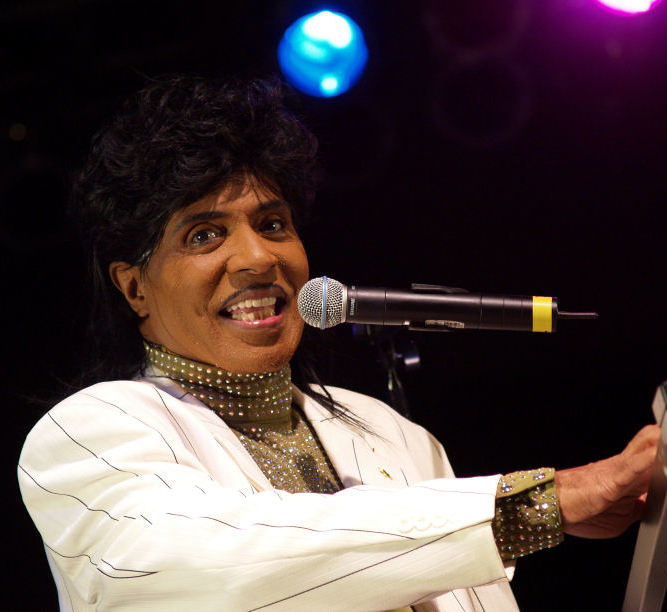
Little Richard performing in 2007

A 2005 recording of his duet vocals with Jerry Lee Lewis on a cover of the Beatles' "I Saw Her Standing There" was included on Lewis's 2006 album, Last Man Standing. The same year, Richard was a guest judge on the TV series Celebrity Duets. Richard and Lewis performed alongside John Fogerty at the 2008 Grammy Awards in a tribute to the two artists considered to be cornerstones of rock and roll by the NARAS. That same year, Richard appeared on radio host Don Imus' benefit album for sick children, The Imus Ranch Record. In 2009, Richard was Inducted into The Louisiana Music Hall Of Fame in a concert in New Orleans. In June 2010, Richard recorded a gospel track for an upcoming tribute album to songwriting legend Dottie Rambo.

Throughout the first decade of the new millennium, Richard kept up a vigorous touring schedule, performing primarily in the United States and Europe. However, sciatic nerve pain in his left leg and then replacement of the involved hip began affecting the frequency of his performances by 2010. Despite his health problems, Richard continued to perform to receptive audiences and critics. Rolling Stone reported that at a performance at the Howard Theater in Washington, D.C., in June 2012, Richard was "still full of fire, still a master showman, his voice still loaded with deep gospel and raunchy power." Richard performed a full 90-minute show at the Pensacola Interstate Fair in Pensacola, Florida, in October 2012, at age 79, and headlined at the Orleans Hotel in Las Vegas during Viva Las Vegas Rockabilly Weekend in March 2013. In September 2013, Rolling Stone published an interview with Richard who said that he would be retiring from performing. "I am done, in a sense, because I don't feel like doing anything right now", he told the magazine, adding, "I think my legacy should be that when I started in showbusiness there wasn't no such thing as rock'n'roll. When I started with 'Tutti Frutti', that's when rock really started rocking." Richard would perform one last concert in Murfreesboro, Tennessee in 2014.

In June 2015, Richard appeared before a benefit concert audience, clad in sparkly boots and a brightly colored jacket at the Wildhorse Saloon in Nashville to receive the Rhapsody & Rhythm Award from and raise funds for the National Museum of African American Music. It was reported that he charmed the crowd by reminiscing about his early days working in Nashville nightclubs. In May 2016, the National Museum of African American Music issued a press release indicating that Richard was one of the key artists and music industry leaders that attended its third annual Celebration of Legends Luncheon in Nashville honoring Shirley Caesar, Kenny Gamble and Leon Huff with Rhapsody & Rhythm Awards. In 2016, a new CD was released on Hitman Records, California (I'm Comin') with released and previously unreleased material from the 1970s, including an a cappella version of his 1975 single release, "Try to Help Your Brother". On September 6, 2017, Richard participated in a television interview for the Christian media ministry, Three Angels Broadcasting Network, appearing in a wheelchair, clean-shaven, without make-up, dressed in a blue paisley coat and tie, where he discussed his Christian faith.

On October 23, 2019, Richard addressed the audience after appearing to receive the Distinguished Artist Award at the 2019 Tennessee Governor's Arts Awards at the Governor's Residence in Nashville, Tennessee.

== Personal life ==
=== Relationships and family ===
Around 1956, Richard became involved with Audrey Robinson, a sixteen-year-old college student, originally from Savannah, Georgia. Richard and Robinson quickly got acquainted even though Robinson was not a rock and roll fan. Richard said in his 1984 autobiography that he invited other men to have sexual encounters with her, including Buddy Holly. Robinson denied those statements. Robinson refused his marriage proposal. Robinson later became known under the name Lee Angel as a stripper and socialite. Richard reconnected with Robinson in the 1960s, though she left him again over his drug abuse. Robinson was interviewed for Richard's 1985 documentary on The South Bank Show and denied Richard's statements. According to Robinson, Richard would use her to buy food in white-only fast food stores that he was not allowed to enter because of his skin color.

Richard met his only wife, Ernestine Harvin, at an evangelical rally in October 1957. They began dating that year and wed on July 12, 1959, in Santa Barbara, California. According to Harvin, she and Richard initially enjoyed a happy marriage with normal sexual relations. When the marriage ended in divorce in April 1964, Harvin said it was due to her husband's celebrity status, which had made life difficult for her. Richard said the marriage fell apart over his neglect and because of his sexuality. Both Robinson and Harvin denied Richard's statements that he was gay, and Richard believed they did not know because he was "such a pumper in those days". During the marriage, Richard and Harvin adopted a one-year-old boy, Danny Jones, from a late church associate. Richard and his son remained close, with Jones often acting as one of his bodyguards.

=== Sexuality ===
In 1984, Richard said that he just played with girls as a child and was subjected to homosexual jokes and ridicule because of his manner of walking and talking. His father brutally punished him whenever he caught him wearing his mother's makeup and clothing. The singer said he had been sexually involved with both sexes as a teenager. Because of his effeminate mannerisms, his father kicked him out of their family home when he was fifteen. In 1985, on The South Bank Show, Richard explained, "my daddy put me out of the house. He said he wanted seven boys, and I had spoiled it, because I was gay."

Richard got involved in voyeurism in his early twenties. A female friend would drive him around picking up men who would allow him to watch them having sex in the backseat of cars. Richard's activity caught the attention of Macon police in 1955 and he was arrested when caught in the act. Cited on a sexual misconduct charge, he spent three days in jail and was temporarily banned from performing in Macon.

In the early 1950s, Richard became acquainted with openly gay musician Billy Wright, who helped in establishing Richard's look, advising him to use pancake makeup and wear his hair in a long-haired pompadour style similar to his. As Richard got used to the makeup, he ordered his band, the Upsetters, to wear makeup too, to gain entry into predominantly white venues. He later stated, "I wore the make-up so that white men wouldn't think I was after the white girls. It made things easier for me, plus it was colorful too." In 2000, Richard told Jet magazine, "I figure if being called a sissy would make me famous, let them say what they want to." Richard's look, however, still attracted female audiences, who would send him naked photos and their phone numbers.

During Richard's heyday, his obsession with voyeurism and group sex continued, with Robinson's participation. Richard wrote that Robinson would have sex with men while she sexually stimulated Richard. Despite saying he was "born again" after leaving rock and roll for the church in 1957, Richard left Oakwood College after exposing himself to a male student. The incident was reported to the student's father, and Richard withdrew from the college. In 1962, Richard was arrested for spying on men urinating in toilets at a Trailways bus station in Long Beach, California.

On May 4, 1982, on Late Night with David Letterman, Richard said, "God gave me the victory. I'm not gay now, but, you know, I was gay all my life. I believe I was one of the first gay people to come out. But God let me know that he made Adam be with Eve, not Steve. So, I gave my heart to Christ." In his 1984 book, while demeaning homosexuality as "unnatural" and "contagious", he told Charles White he was "omnisexual".

In 1995, Richard told Penthouse that he always knew he was gay, saying "I've been gay all my life". In 2007, Mojo Magazine referred to Richard as "bisexual".

In October 2017, Richard once again denounced homosexuality in an interview with the Christian Three Angels Broadcasting Network, calling homosexual and transgender identity "unnatural affection" that goes against "the way God wants you to live".

=== Drug use ===
During his initial heyday in the 1950s rock and roll scene, Richard was a teetotaler abstaining from alcohol, tobacco, and other drugs. Richard often fined bandmates for using alcohol and other drugs during this era. By the mid-1960s, however, Richard began drinking heavily and smoking tobacco and marijuana. By 1972, he had developed an addiction to cocaine. He later lamented that period, "They should have called me Lil Cocaine, I was sniffing so much of that stuff!" By 1975, he had developed addictions to both heroin and PCP, otherwise known as "angel dust". His use of alcohol and other drugs began to affect his career and personal life. "I lost my reasoning", he later recalled.

Of his cocaine addiction, he said that he did whatever he could to use cocaine. Richard admitted that his addictions to cocaine, PCP, and heroin were costing him as much as $1,000 a day. In 1977, longtime friend Larry Williams showed up with a gun and threatened to kill him for failing to pay his drug debt. Richard said that this was the most fearful moment of his life; Williams' own drug addiction made him wildly unpredictable. Richard acknowledged that he and Williams were "very close friends" and when reminiscing of the drug-fueled clash, he recalled thinking "I knew he loved me—I hoped he did!" Within that same year, Richard had several devastating personal experiences, including his brother Tony's death of a heart attack, the accidental shooting of his nephew whom he loved like a son, and the murder of two close personal friends – one a valet at "the heroin man's house." These experiences convinced the singer to give up alcohol and other drugs, along with rock and roll, and return to the ministry.

=== Religion ===
Richard's family had deep evangelical (Baptist and African Methodist Episcopal Church (AME)) Christian roots, including two uncles and a grandfather who were preachers. He also took part in Macon's Pentecostal churches, which were his favorites mainly due to their music, charismatic praise, dancing in the Holy Spirit and speaking in tongues. At age ten, influenced by Pentecostalism, he went around saying he was a faith healer, singing gospel music to people who were feeling sick and touching them. He later recalled that they would often indicate that they felt better after he prayed for them and would sometimes give him money. Richard had aspirations to become a preacher due to the influence of singing evangelist Brother Joe May.

After he was born again in 1957, Richard enrolled at Oakwood College in Huntsville, Alabama, a mostly black Seventh-day Adventist (SDA) college, to study theology. He became a vegetarian, which coincided with his return to religion. He was ordained a minister in 1970 and resumed evangelical activities in 1977. Richard represented Memorial Bibles International and sold their Black Heritage Bible, which highlighted the Book's many black characters. As a preacher, he evangelized in small churches and packed auditoriums of 20,000 or more. His preaching focused on uniting the races and bringing lost souls to repentance through God's love. In 1984, Richard's mother, Leva Mae, died following a period of illness. Prior to her death, Richard promised her that he would remain a Christian.

During the 1980s and 1990s, Richard officiated at celebrity weddings. In 2006, in one ceremony, Richard wedded twenty couples who won a contest. The musician used his experience and knowledge as a minister and elder statesman of rock and roll to preach at funerals of musical friends such as Wilson Pickett and Ike Turner. At a benefit concert in 2009 to raise funds to help rebuild children's playgrounds that were destroyed by Hurricane Katrina, Richard asked guest of honor Fats Domino to pray with him and others. His assistants handed out inspirational booklets at the concert, a common practice at Richard's shows. Richard told a Howard Theatre, Washington, D.C., audience in June 2012, "I know this is not Church, but get close to the Lord. The world is getting close to the end. Get close to the Lord." In 2013, Richard elaborated on his spiritual philosophies, stating "God talked to me the other night. He said He's getting ready to come. The world's getting ready to end and He's coming, wrapped in flames of fire with a rainbow around his throne." Rolling Stone reported that his apocalyptic prophesies generated snickers from some audience members as well as cheers of support. Richard responded to the laughter by stating: "When I talk to you about [Jesus], I'm not playing. I'm almost 81 years old. Without God, I wouldn't be here."

In 1986, it was reported that Richard converted to Judaism at the encouragement of Bob Dylan—but "Richard saw Judaism as not contradicting his other beliefs."

In 2017, Richard returned to his SDA spiritual roots and appeared in a televised interview on 3ABN and later he shared his personal testimony at 3ABN Fall Camp Meeting 2017.

=== Health problems and death ===
In October 1985, having finished Lifetime Friend, Richard returned from England to film a guest spot on the show Miami Vice. Following the taping, he reportedly fell asleep at the wheel and crashed his Nissan 300ZX into a telephone pole in West Hollywood, California. He suffered a broken right leg, broken ribs and head and facial injuries. His recovery took several months, preventing him from attending the inaugural Rock and Roll Hall of Fame ceremony in January 1986 where he was one of several inductees. He instead supplied a recorded message.

In 2007, Richard began having problems walking due to sciatica in his left leg, requiring him to use crutches. In November 2009, he entered a hospital to have replacement surgery on his left hip. Despite returning to performing the following year, Richard's problems with his hip continued and he was brought onstage in a wheelchair, able to play only while seated. On September 30, 2013, he revealed to CeeLo Green at a Recording Academy fundraiser that he had suffered a heart attack the week before. Taking aspirin and having his son turn on the air conditioner saved his life according to his doctor. Richard stated, "Jesus had something for me. He brought me through."

On April 28, 2016, Richard's friend Bootsy Collins stated on his Facebook page that, "he is not in the best of health so I ask all the Funkateers to lift him up." Reports stated that Richard was in grave health and that his family were gathering at his bedside. On May 3, 2016, Rolling Stone provided a health update by Richard and his lawyer; Richard stated, "not only is my family not gathering around me because I'm ill, but I'm still singing. I don't perform like I used to, but I have my singing voice, I walk around, I had hip surgery a while ago but I'm healthy." His lawyer said, "He's 83. I don't know how many 83-year-olds still get up and rock it out every week, but in light of the rumors, I wanted to tell you that he's vivacious and conversant about a ton of different things and he's still very active in a daily routine." Though Richard continued to sing in his eighties, he kept away from the stage.

On May 9, 2020, after a two-month illness, Richard died at the age of 87 at his home in Tullahoma, Tennessee, from bone cancer. His brother, sister, and son were with him. Richard received tributes from popular musicians, including Bob Dylan, Paul McCartney, Mick Jagger, John Fogerty, Elton John, and Lenny Kravitz. He is interred at Oakwood University Memorial Gardens Cemetery in Huntsville, Alabama.

== Legacy ==
=== Music ===
He claims to be "the architect of rock and roll", and history would seem to bear out Little Richard's boast. More than any other performer—save, perhaps, Elvis Presley, Little Richard blew the lid off the Fifties, laying the foundation for rock and roll with his explosive music and charismatic persona. On record, he made spine-tingling rock and roll. His frantically charged piano playing and raspy, shouted vocals on such classics as "Tutti Frutti", "Long Tall Sally" and "Good Golly, Miss Molly" defined the dynamic sound of rock and roll.

— Rock and Roll Hall of Fame

Richard's music and performance style had a pivotal effect on the sound and style of popular 20th century music genres. Richard embodied the rock and roll spirit more flamboyantly than any other performer. Richard's raspy shouting style gave the genre one of its most identifiable and influential vocal sounds and his fusion of boogie-woogie, New Orleans R&B and gospel music blazed its rhythmic trail. Richard's emotive vocalizations and uptempo rhythmic music drove the formation of other popular music genres, including soul and funk. He influenced singers and musicians across musical genres from rock to hip-hop; his music helped shape rhythm and blues for generations. Richard introduced several of rock music's most characteristic musical features, including its high volume, vocal style emphasizing power, its distinctive beat, and innovative visceral rhythms. He departed from boogie-woogie's shuffle rhythm and introduced a distinctive rock beat, where the beat division is even at all tempos. He reinforced this rhythm with a two-handed piano style, playing patterns with his right hand, with the rhythm typically popping out in the piano's high register. His rhythm pattern, which he introduced with "Tutti Frutti" (1955), became the basis for the standard rock beat, which was later consolidated by Chuck Berry. "Lucille" (1957) foreshadowed the rhythmic feel of 1960s classic rock in several ways, including its heavy bassline, slower tempo, strong rock beat played by the entire band, and verse–chorus form similar to the blues.

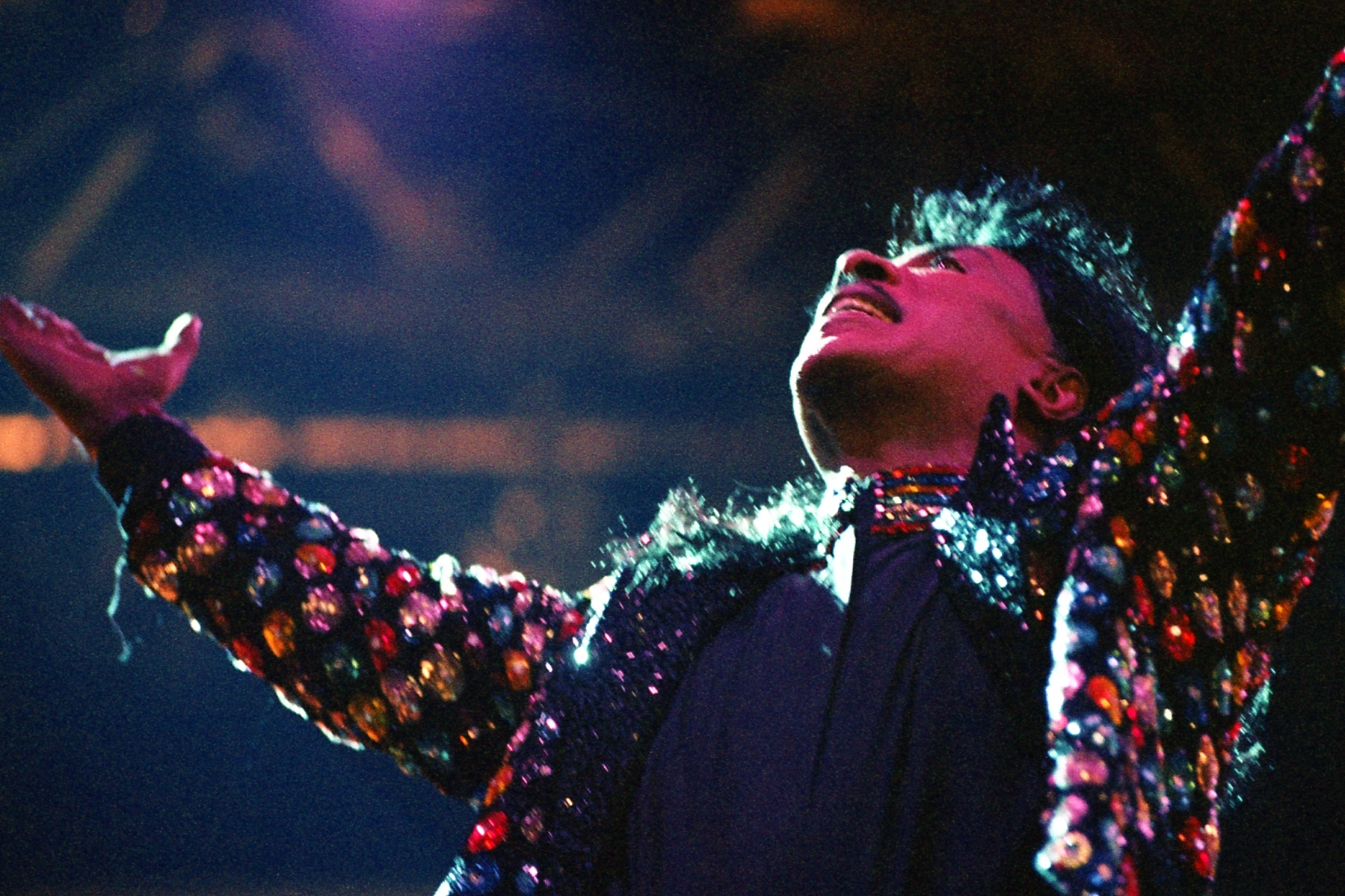
Little Richard in concert

Richard's voice was able to generate croons, wails, and screams unprecedented in popular music. He was cited by two of soul music's pioneers, Otis Redding and Sam Cooke, as contributing to the genre's early development. Redding stated that most of his music was patterned after Richard's, referring to his 1953 recording "Directly From My Heart To You" as the personification of soul, and that he had "done a lot for [him] and [his] soul brothers in the music business." Cooke said in 1962 that Richard had done "so much for our music". Cooke had a top 40 hit in 1963 with his cover of Richard's 1956 hit "Send Me Some Loving".

James Brown and others credited Richard and his mid-1950s backing band, The Upsetters, as the first to put funk in the rock beat.

Richard's hits of the mid-1950s, such as "Tutti Frutti", "Long Tall Sally", "Keep A-Knockin'" and "Good Golly, Miss Molly", were generally characterized by playful lyrics with sexually suggestive connotations. AllMusic writer Richie Unterberger stated that Little Richard "merged the fire of gospel with New Orleans R&B, pounding the piano and wailing with gleeful abandon", and that while "other R&B greats of the early 1950s had been moving in a similar direction, none of them matched the sheer electricity of Richard's vocals. With his high-speed deliveries, ecstatic trills, and the overjoyed force of personality in his singing, he was crucial in upping the voltage from high-powered R&B into the similar, yet different, guise of rock and roll."

Emphasizing Richard's folk influences, English professor W. T. Lhamon Jr. wrote, "His songs were literally good booty. They were the repressed stuff of underground lore. And in Little Richard they found a vehicle prepared to bear their chocked energy, at least for his capsulated moment."

Ray Charles introduced him at a concert in 1988 as "a man that started a kind of music that set the pace for a lot of what's happening today." Richard's contemporaries, including Elvis Presley, Buddy Holly, Bill Haley, Jerry Lee Lewis, Pat Boone, the Everly Brothers, Gene Vincent and Eddie Cochran, all recorded covers of his works. As they wrote about him for their Man of the Year – Legend category in 2010, GQ magazine stated that Richard "is, without question, the boldest and most influential of the founding fathers of rock'n'roll."

=== Society ===
In addition to his musical style, Richard was cited as one of the first black crossover artists, reaching audiences of all races. His music and concerts broke the color line, drawing mixed black and white audiences. As H.B. Barnum explained in Quasar of Rock, Little Richard "opened the door. He brought the races together." Barnum described Richard's music as not being "boy-meets-girl-girl-meets-boy things, they were fun records, all fun. And they had a lot to say sociologically in our country and the world." Barnum also stated that Richard's "charisma was a whole new thing to the music business", explaining that "he would burst onto the stage from anywhere, and you wouldn't be able to hear anything but the roar of the audience. He might come out and walk on the piano. He might go out into the audience." Barnum stated that Richard was innovative in that he would wear colorful capes, blouse shirts, makeup and suits studded with multi-colored stones and sequins, and that he also brought flickering stage lighting from his show business experience into performance venues where rock and roll artists performed. In 2015, the National Museum of African American Music honored Richard for helping to shatter the color line on the music charts changing American culture forever.

Ian "Lemmy" Kilmister of the hard rock band Motörhead spoke highly of him, stating: "Little Richard was always my main man. How hard must it have been for him: gay, black and singing in the South? But his records are a joyous good time from beginning to end."

=== Influence ===
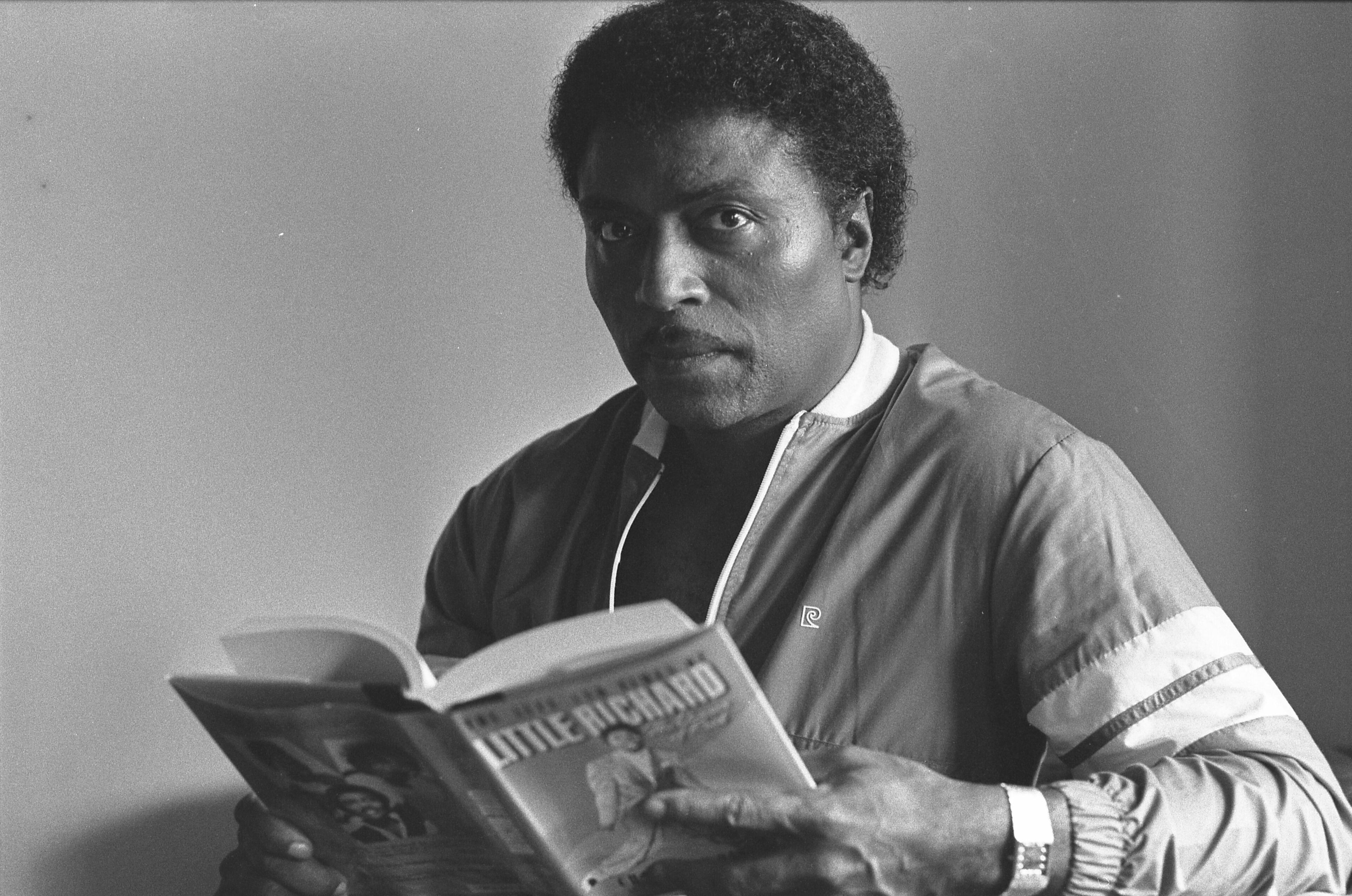
Little Richard in 1984

Richard influenced generations of performers. Quincy Jones stated that Richard was "an innovator whose influence spans America's musical diaspora from Gospel, the Blues & R&B, to Rock & Roll, & Hip-Hop." James Brown and Otis Redding both idolized him. Brown allegedly came up with the Famous Flames debut hit, "Please, Please, Please", after Richard had written the words on a napkin. Redding started his professional career with Richard's band, The Upsetters. and first entered a talent show performing Richard's "Heeby Jeebies", winning for fifteen consecutive weeks. Ike Turner claimed most of Tina Turner's early vocal delivery was based on Richard, something Richard reiterated in the introduction of Turner's autobiography, Takin' Back My Name. Richard influenced Ritchie Valens; before he broke out, Valens was known as the "Little Richard of San Fernando". Bob Dylan performed covers of Richard's songs in high school with his rock and roll group, the Golden Chords; in his high school yearbook, under "Ambition", he wrote: "to join Little Richard".

The Beatles were heavily influenced by Richard. Paul McCartney idolized him in school and later used his recordings as inspiration for his uptempo rockers, such as "I'm Down". "Long Tall Sally" was the first song McCartney performed in public. McCartney later stated, "I could do Little Richard's voice, which is a wild, hoarse, screaming thing. It's like an out-of-body experience. You have to leave your current sensibilities and go about a foot above your head to sing it." John Lennon recalled that upon hearing "Long Tall Sally" in 1956, he was so impressed that he "couldn't speak". During the Beatles' Rock and Roll Hall of Fame induction, George Harrison commented, "thank you all very much, especially the rock 'n' rollers, an' Little Richard there, if it wasn't for [gesturing to Little Richard], it was all his fault, really." Mick Jagger and Keith Richards of the Rolling Stones were also profoundly influenced by him, with Jagger citing him as his introduction to R&B and calling him "the originator and my first idol". Richard was the first rock n roll influence on Rod Stewart and Peter Wolf. Others influenced by Richard early on included Bob Seger and John Fogerty. Michael Jackson admitted that Richard had been a huge influence on him prior to the release of Off the Wall. Jimi Hendrix was influenced in appearance and sound by Richard. He was quoted in 1966 saying, "I want to do with my guitar what Little Richard does with his voice."

Hard rock and heavy metal bands have cited Richard as an influence. John Kay of Steppenwolf recalls hearing "Tutti Frutti" on a U.S. Armed Forces station in East Prussia in the mid-1950s: "it was unlike anything I ever heard before and it was instant 'chicken skin time' - I mean goosebumps from head to toe. From that time on my focus was to hear as much of that stuff as possible, and after a while it became a kind of adolescent dream that someday [I] would be on the other side of the ocean, would learn how to speak English, and this music is something that I would play." Robert Plant of Led Zeppelin recalls: "I was a 13-year-old boy in Kidderminster when I heard Little Richard for the first time. My parents shielded me from anything that was worldly. I spent my time searching feverishly through my stamp collection or working on my Meccano, and then someone played me 'Good Golly, Miss Molly'. The sound! It was fantastic, indescribable." Jon Lord of Deep Purple said "There would have been no Deep Purple if there had been no Little Richard." AC/DC's early lead vocalist and co-songwriter Bon Scott idolized Richard and aspired to sing like him, its lead guitarist and co-songwriter Angus Young was first inspired to play guitar after listening to Richard, and rhythm guitarist and co-writer Malcolm Young derived his signature sound from playing his guitar like Richard's piano. Motörhead was heavily influenced by Richard; Lemmy Kilmister said Richard should be "Golden God".

Richard was an influence on glam rock. David Bowie called Richard his "inspiration", recalling that upon hearing "Tutti Frutti" he "heard God". After opening for him with his band Bluesology, Elton John was inspired to be a "rock and roll piano player". Lou Reed referred to Richard as his "rock and roll hero", deriving inspiration from "the soulful, primal force" of the sound Richard and his saxophonist made on "Long Tall Sally". Reed later stated, "I don't know why and I don't care, but I wanted to go to wherever that sound was and make a life." Freddie Mercury performed covers of Richard's songs as a teen, before finding fame with Queen.

The sexuality of Richard's persona has been influential. Rock critics noted similarities between Prince's androgynous look, music and vocal style and Richard's. Patti Smith said, "To me, Little Richard was a person that was able to focus a certain physical, anarchistic, and spiritual energy into a form which we call rock 'n' roll ... I understood it as something that had to do with my future. When I was a little girl, Santa Claus didn't turn me on. Easter Bunny didn't turn me on. God turned me on. Little Richard turned me on."

Richard's influence continues. Mystikal and André "3000" Benjamin were cited by critics as having emulated Richard's style in their own works. Mystikal's vocal delivery was compared to Richard's. André 3000's vocals in Outkast's hit "Hey Ya!" were compared to an "indie rock Little Richard". Bruno Mars declared that Richard was one of his and his performer-father's early influences. Mars' song "Runaway Baby" was cited by The New York Times as "channeling Little Richard". Chris Cornell of Audioslave and Soundgarden traced his musical influences back to Richard via the Beatles.

==== Tribute in film ====
On September 4, 2023, the Rolling Stone-produced documentary Little Richard: I Am Everything premiered following its breakout premier at the 2023 Sundance Film Festival. The documentary received a Grammy nomination for Best Music Film in 2024.

The late singer's complexities and contributions are explored throughout the film. It digs into the Influence of early blues queens such as Ma Rainey and early rhythm and blues artists. It portrays his influence and mentoring of artists James Brown, Jimi Hendrix, Prince, and later pop artists whose performances are interpreted as risqué or provocative from Lady Gaga to Lil Nas X.

Notable scholars featured include Nelson George, Jason King, and Fredara Hadley.

=== Honors ===
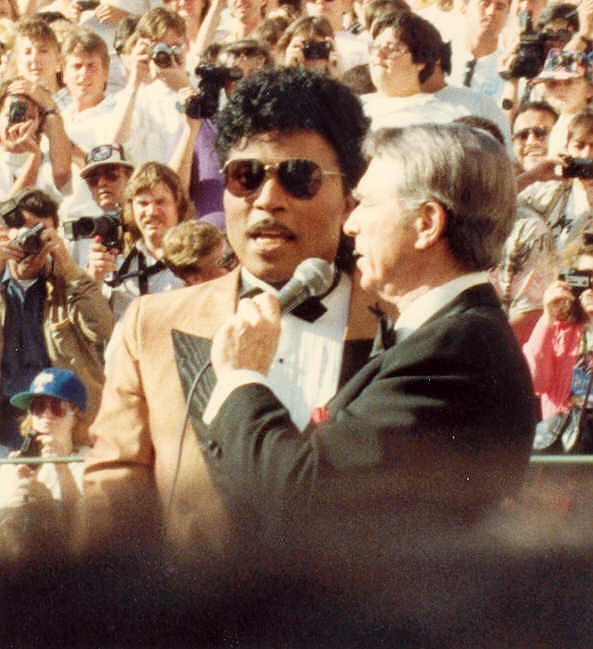
Little Richard, interviewed during the 60th Annual Academy Awards, 1988

In the early 1990s, a portion of Mercer University Drive in Macon was renamed "Little Richard Penniman Boulevard". Just south of the renamed boulevard sits Little Richard Penniman Park.

In 2007, a panel of renowned recording artists voted "Tutti Frutti" number one on Mojo's The Top 100 Records That Changed The World, hailing the recording as "the sound of the birth of rock and roll". In April 2012, Rolling Stone magazine declared that the song "still has the most inspired rock lyric on record". The same recording was inducted to the Library of Congress' National Recording Registry in 2010, with the library claiming the "unique vocalizing over the irresistible beat announced a new era in music".

In 2010, Time magazine listed Here's Little Richard as one of the 100 Greatest and Most Influential Albums of All Time. Rolling Stone listed his Here's Little Richard at number fifty on the magazine's list of the 500 Greatest Albums of All Time. He was ranked eighth on its list of the 100 Greatest Artists of All Time. Rolling Stone listed three of Richard's recordings, "The Girl Can't Help It", "Long Tall Sally" and "Tutti Frutti", on their 500 Greatest Songs of All Time. Two of the latter songs and "Good Golly, Miss Molly" were listed on the Rock and Roll Hall of Fame's 500 Songs that Shaped Rock and Roll.

A 2010 UK issue of GQ named Richard its Man of the Year in its Legend category.

Richard appeared in person to receive an honorary degree from Mercer University in 2013. The day before the award ceremony, the mayor of Macon announced that one of Richard's childhood homes, an historic site, would be moved to a rejuvenated section of Pleasant Hill to be restored and named the Little Richard Penniman—Pleasant Hill Resource House. It would serve as a meeting place full of local history and artifacts.

On March 14, 2021, Bruno Mars with Anderson .Paak honored Richard at the 2021 Grammy Award ceremony. The performance was reported in the media to be the highlight of the show.

In 2023, Rolling Stone ranked Little Richard at No. 11 on its list of the 200 Greatest Singers of All Time.

=== Awards ===
Although Richard never won a competitive Grammy, he received the Grammy Lifetime Achievement Award in 1993. His album Here's Little Richard and three of his songs ("Tutti Frutti", "Lucille" and "Long Tall Sally") are inducted into the Grammy Hall of Fame.

Richard received various awards for his key role in the formation of popular music genres.

- 1956: He received the Cashbox Triple Crown Award for "Long Tall Sally" in 1956.
- 1984: He was inducted into the Georgia Music Hall of Fame.
- 1986: He was inducted to the Rock and Roll Hall of Fame as a member of the initial class of inductees chosen for that honor.
- 1990: He received a star on the Hollywood Walk of Fame.
- 1994: He received the Lifetime Achievement Award from the Rhythm and Blues Foundation.
- 1997: He received the American Music Award of Merit.
- 2002: Along with Chuck Berry and Bo Diddley, he was honored as one of the first group of BMI icons at the 50th Annual BMI Pop Awards.
- 2002: He was inducted into the NAACP Image Award Hall of Fame.
- 2003: He was inducted into the Songwriters Hall of Fame.
- 2006: He was inducted into the Apollo Theater Hall of Fame.
- 2008: He received a star on Nashville's Music City Walk of Fame.
- 2009: He was inducted to the Louisiana Music Hall of Fame.
- 2010: He received a plaque on the Apollo Theater's Walk of Fame.
- 2015: He was inducted into the Blues Hall of Fame.
- 2015: He was inducted into the Rhythm and Blues Music Hall of Fame.
- 2015: He received the Rhapsody & Rhythm Award from the National Museum of African American Music.
- 2019: He received the Distinguished Artist Award at the 2019 Tennessee Governor's Arts Awards.

== In popular culture ==
In 1991, Richard served as the inspiration for the professional wrestling gimmick Johnny B. Badd. Active in WCW, the gimmick was conceived by booker Dusty Rhodes and portrayed by wrestler Marc Mero. The character was initially a villain but became beloved by the fans, leading him to become a good guy where he remained a fan favourite in WCW until Mero's departure from the promotion in 1996. Mero would revive the Johnny B. Badd. character while working for the XWF and TNA Wrestling between 2001 and 2005.

In 2000, Leon Robinson portrayed Little Richard in the NBC television biopic Little Richard.

In 2003, Little Richard voiced a fictionalized version of himself in the Simpsons episode "Special Edna"; he portrayed a presenter for the Teacher of the Year awards ceremony in Orlando, Florida, and remarks that he is also a teacher because he "taught Paul McCartney to go 'woo!'"

In 2014, actor Brandon Mychal Smith received critical acclaim for his portrayal of Richard in the James Brown biographical drama film Get on Up. Mick Jagger co-produced.

During season 7 of RuPaul's Drag Race, contestant Kennedy Davenport portrayed Richard during the Snatch Game episode, making him the first male character ever impersonated for the challenge.

In 2022, Alton Mason portrayed Little Richard in the movie biopic Elvis.

== Discography ==
Main albums

- Here's Little Richard (1957)
- Little Richard (1958)
- The Fabulous Little Richard (1958)
- Pray Along with Little Richard (1960)
- Pray Along with Little Richard (Vol 2) (1960)
- The King of the Gospel Singers (1962)
- Little Richard Is Back (And There's A Whole Lotta Shakin' Goin' On!) (1964)
- Little Richard's Greatest Hits (1965)
- The Incredible Little Richard Sings His Greatest Hits - Live! (1967, live)
- The Wild and Frantic Little Richard (1967, compilation)
- The Explosive Little Richard (1967)
- Little Richard's Greatest Hits: Recorded Live! (1967, live)
- The Rill Thing (1970)
- Mr. Big (1971, compilation)
- The King of Rock and Roll (1971)
- Friends from the Beginning – Little Richard and Jimi Hendrix (1972, compilation)
- The Second Coming (1972)
- Right Now! (1974)
- Talkin' 'bout Soul (1974, compilation)
- Little Richard Live (1976, studio re-recreations of Specialty tracks)
- God's Beautiful City (1979)
- Lifetime Friend (1986)
- Shake It All About (1992)
- Little Richard Meets Masayoshi Takanaka (1992)
- Southern Child (2005, recorded in 1972)

== Filmography ==
- The Girl Can't Help It (1956), lip-syncing the title number (different version from record), "Ready Teddy" and "She's Got It"
- Don't Knock the Rock (1956), lip-syncing "Long Tall Sally" and "Tutti Frutti"
- Mister Rock and Roll (1957), lip-syncing "Lucille" and "Keep A-Knockin'", on original prints
- Catalina Caper (a.k.a. Never Steal Anything Wet, 1967), Richard lip-syncs an original tune, "Scuba Party", still unreleased on record by 2019.
- Little Richard: Live at the Toronto Peace Festival (1969) – released on DVD in 2009 by Shout! Factory
- The London Rock & Roll Show (1973), performing "Lucille", "Rip It Up", "Good Golly Miss Molly", "Tutti Frutti", "I Believe" [a capella, a few lines], and "Jenny Jenny"
- Jimi Hendrix (1973)
- Let the Good Times Roll (1973) featured performances and behind-the-scenes candid footage of Little Richard, Chuck Berry, Bo Diddley, Fats Domino, Bill Haley, the Five Satins, The Shirelles, Chubby Checker, and Danny and the Juniors.
- Miami Vice - S2E4 "Out Where The Buses Don't Run" as Reverend (1985)
- Down and Out in Beverly Hills (1986), co-starred as Orvis Goodnight and performed the production number, "Great Gosh A-Mighty"
- Hail! Hail! Rock 'n' Roll TV documentary (1987)
- Goddess of Love Made-for-TV film (1988)
- Purple People Eater (1988)
- Scenes from the Class Struggle in Beverly Hills (1989) (uncredited)
- Bill & Ted's Excellent Adventures (1990) (voice)
- Mother Goose Rock 'n' Rhyme (1990)
- Blossom – S1E5 (1991)
- Columbo – S10E3 "Columbo and the Murder of a Rock Star" (1991) (Cameo)
- FernGully: The Last Rainforest (1992) (voice--uncredited)
- The Naked Truth (1992)
- Sunset Heat (aka Midnight Heat) (1992)
- James Brown: The Man, The Message, The Music TV Documentary (1992)
- Martin S1E12 "Three Men and a Mouse" as The Exterminator (1992)
- The Pickle (1993)
- Last Action Hero (1993)
- Full House (1993) (Cameo) – Episode: Too Little Richard Too Late
- Baywatch (1995) as Maurice in Episode: The Runaways
- Be Cool About Fire Safety (1996) as Himself
- The Drew Carey Show (1997) (cameo) – Episode: Drewstock
- Why Do Fools Fall in Love (1998)
- Muppets Tonight (1998) – Episode: The Cameo Show
- Mystery Alaska (1999)
- The Trumpet of the Swan (2001) (voice)
- The Simpsons (2002) (voice)
