= Peter Clifton =

Australian film director and producer (1945–2018)

- Born: 1941; Sydney, Australia
- Died: 31 May 2018 (aged 76–77)
- Occupations: Film director, producer

Peter Clifton (1941 – 31 May 2018) was an Australian film director. His most commercially successful work was the Led Zeppelin concert film The Song Remains the Same (1976).

Clifton was born in Sydney and had experience in music film production prior to his involvement with Led Zeppelin, having made a 30-minute cinema short about Australian band The Easybeats' tour of England in 1967, called Somewhere Between Heaven And Woolworths, and also having filmed Jimi Hendrix live in concert. In 1973 he also directed two films of music footage: Sound of the City: London 1964–73 (also known as Rock City), which featured both concert footage and interviews, and The London Rock and Roll Show, which documented a major rock and roll festival held at Wembley Stadium, London, in August 1972. In 1974 he was planning to shoot a reggae film in Jamaica when he was approached by Led Zeppelin's manager, Peter Grant, to complete their concert film. The film had originally been begun by director Joe Massot, but Massot was fired by the band prior to its completion.

In 1979 Clifton directed the concert film Live in Central Park, featuring the final concert of America's world tour – the only time that the band has been officially captured on film. Clifton also made the famous film clip of the Rolling Stones' performance of "Jumpin' Jack Flash". He has produced many other Rolling Stones clips and videos, along with videos for The Beach Boys, Jim Morrison and Eric Clapton. Clifton also filmed in 1979 a live concert from Supertramp called 'Paris' on 16mm, the film was found in 2006 and restored with the help of Clifton.

Clifton returned to Australia in the mid-1980s after many years living overseas to start the Hard Rock Cafe there. It opened in Sydney on 1 April 1989. In 1984 produced and directed the rockumentary AUSTRALIA NOW ! starring INXS, Men at Work, Midnight Oil and Split Enz.

In 2003 Clifton co-wrote with Michael Thomas and produced his first feature film, The Night We Called It a Day, the story of Frank Sinatra's tour of Australia in 1974.

In 2009, Clifton co-produced The Bloody Ashes, a film which focuses on the 1932–33 Ashes Bodyline series. He also began developing the Peter FitzSimons book Tobruk into a feature film.

Clifton died in May 2018.
