= Goldner =

Goldner is a surname. Notable people with the surname include:

- Antonia Goldner (born 1981), German politician
- Brian Goldner (1963–2021), the chief executive officer of the American toy company Hasbro
- Charles Goldner, Austrian-born actor who appeared in a number of British films during the 1940s and 1950s
- Diane Goldner (born 1956), actress, best known for her roles in her husband, John Gulager's film series Feast
- George Goldner (1918–1970), American record label owner and promoter
- Janet Goldner (born 1952), American artist
- Justin Goldner, American record producer and musician
- Richard Goldner (1908–1991), Romanian-born, Viennese-trained Australian violist, pedagogue and inventor
- Stephanie Goldner (1896–1962), Austrian American harpist and the first female member of the New York Philharmonic in 1922
- Vladimir Goldner (born 1933), Croatian physician, academic and professor
- Eugene Goldner ("Snotty boy"), a character from the movie Barnyard and its TV series

== See also ==
- Goldner–Harary graph, simple undirected graph with 11 vertices and 27 edges
- Goldner String Quartet, Australian string quartet formed in 1995 in honour of Richard Goldner, the founder of Musica Viva Australia
