= Matchbox (band) =

English rockabilly band

- Origin: Middlesex. England
- Genres: Rockabilly
- Years active: 1971–present
- Labels: Magnet Records
- Members: Steve Bloomfield; Jimmy Redhead; Gordon Scott; Fred Poke
- Past members: Graham Fenton; Dick Callan; Ian Terry; Wiffle Smith; Bob Burgos; Rusty Lupton; Brian Hodgson; Gerry Hogan see below
- Website: rockabillyrebel.co.uk

Matchbox are an English rockabilly band that formed in 1971, and are still active as of 2025.

== Career ==
Matchbox were formed in Middlesex, in 1971 by Iain "Houndog" Terry (born 1950), Fred Poke (born 1948), Jimmy Redhead (born 1954) and Wiffle Smith (born 1948). After 1978, the line-up consisted of Graham Fenton (lead vocalist, born 28 May 1947), Steve Bloomfield (lead guitar, vocals), Gordon Scott (rhythm guitar), Fred Poke (bass guitar) and Jimmy Redhead (drums). Redhead left in 1973 (returning in 1978), Smith in 1977 and Lupton in 1978 to tour with Chuck Berry. Dick Callan joined Matchbox on guitar, saxophone and violin until approximately 1985, writing many of the band's B-sides. The band appeared in the 1980 film Blue Suede Shoes which detailed the revival of 1950s rock 'n' roll music scene at the time.

The band's biggest hits include "Rockabilly Rebel" (Bloomfield, 1979), "Midnite Dynamos" (Bloomfield, 1980), a cover of The Crickets' "When You Ask About Love" (their only top five hit), and "Over the Rainbow" (adapted musical song, 1980). In Australia, the band and album were dubbed 'Major Matchbox' to prevent confusion with an Australian band of a similar name. Their last single, "I Want Out" (Brian Hodgson/Ray Peters/Tony Colton, 1983) from their album, Crossed Line, was produced together with Kirsty MacColl.

In 1989, Graham Fenton put together a band with Iain Terry, Bob Burgos, Howard Gadd and Greg Gadd. They called themselves Graham Fenton's Matchbox. They recorded six albums in the early 1990s. The most popular Matchbox line-up reformed in 1995. The band have been playing live all over Europe since their comeback, especially in Germany, France, the Netherlands, Spain, Finland and Sweden. On occasions, Iain Terry and Dave Dix were used as replacements for Bloomfield and Poke.

They have recorded one album since their full 1995 reunion.

Fenton died on 10 August 2025, at the age of 78.

== Band members ==
- Line-up 1971–1975: Wiffle Smith, Iain "Houndog" Terry, Fred Poke and Jimmy Redhead
- Line-up 1976–1977: Wiffle Smith, Steve Bloomfield, Fred Poke, Rusty Lupton and Wild Bob Burgos
- Line-up 1977–1978: Steve Bloomfield, Fred Poke, Bob Burgos, Rusty Lupton and Graham Fenton
- Line-up 1978–1980: Steve Bloomfield, Fred Poke, Graham Fenton, Gordon Scott and Jimmy Redhead
- Line-up 1980–1981: Steve Bloomfield, Fred Poke, Graham Fenton, Gordon Scott, Jimmy Redhead and Dick Callan
- Line-up 1982–1985: Graham Fenton, Dick Callan, Jimmy Redhead, Gordon Scott and Brian Hodgson
- Line-up 1985–198?: Graham Fenton, Dick Callan, Jimmy Redhead, Brian Hodgson and Gerry Hogan
- Line-up 1995–2025: Graham Fenton, Steve Bloomfield, Jimmy Redhead, Gordon Scott and Fred Poke
- Line-up 2025–Present: Steve Bloomfield, Jimmy Redhead, Gordon Scott and Fred Poke

== Discography ==
Riders In The Sky Rockhouse (NL) 1976 Side One: Matchbox (Carl Perkins) All The Boys (Love My Baby) (Steve Bloomfield) Wash Machine Boogie (Bill Browning) Only Wanna Rock (Steve Bloomfield) In The Mood (Raual/Garlana) Crying Heart (Steve Bloomfield) Let's Go Crazy (Steve Bloomfield) Race With The Devil (Sheriff Tex Davis) Three Alley Cats (Rule/Roy Hall)

Side Two: Please Don't Touch (Johnny Kidd) Undeclared (Steve Bloomfield) Baby Let's Play House (Gunter) Teenage Boogie (Webb Pierce) It's Only Make Believe (Twitty/Nance) Make Like A Rock'n'Roll (Woody/Simmons) Steelabilly (Steve Bloomfield) It Don't Take But A Few Minutes (Chuck Berry) (Ghost) Riders In The Sky (Jones)
