= Southern Child =

Studio album by Little Richard
- Released: January 2005
- Recorded: April – May 1972
- Genre: Country, R&B
- Label: Reprise
- Producer: Robert "Bumps" Blackwell

Southern Child is an album by Little Richard, scheduled to be released in 1972 as his third album for Reprise Records. It was going to be Reprise RS 2097. For unconfirmed reasons the album was shelved in favour of The Second Coming, released in October. The tracks comprising the album were released in 2005 from Rhino Records as part of their Complete Reprise Recordings collection. A stand-alone version was released in December 2020.

== History ==
The sleeve notes for the Complete Reprise Recordings had it that: "Cut at more or less the same time and in the same place as the Second Coming material, ten further songs were mixed, sequenced, assembled onto master reels, and delivered to Reprise. Having decided on the title Southern Child, the label even had the album art photographed: 'It was me milking a cow that they brought into the backyard of my home,' recalls Richard. But that was as far as it went. For reasons that remain hazy, Southern Child was never released... until now, more than 32 years after it was recorded".

An eleventh track recorded at the same sessions but not selected for the album (though released with The Complete Reprise Recordings) was a 4:11m instrumental, "Sneak the Freak”, which is anomalous with its ‘50s pianistics and saxophone playing - also contains a distinct fluff by the rhythm guitarist.

Many of the tracks were copyrighted before the release of The Second Coming. Richard performed "Burning Up with Love" on The Merv Griffin Show before the release of The Second Coming; he also mentioned his "new" album, "The Southern Child", on the show.

== Track listing ==
All tracks composed by Richard Penniman; except where noted.

1. "California (I'm Comin')" (Randy Ostin, Richard Penniman, Keith Winslow) – 3:16
2. "If You Pick Her Too Hard (She Comes Out of Tune)" (Richard Penniman; another source credits Michael Deasy) – 3:51
3. "Burning Up with Love" (Richard Penniman; another source credits Michael Deasy ) - 3:20
4. "Ain't No Tellin'" (Randy Ostin, Richard Penniman, Keith Winslow) – 5:54
5. "Last Year's Race Horse (Can't Run in This Year's Race)" – 4:14
6. "Southern Child" – 2:56
7. "In the Name" – 2:57
8. "Over Yonder" – 3:54
9. "I Git a Little Lonely" – 1:43
10. "Puppy Dog Song" (Richard Penniman, Chuck Rainey) – 8:40

== Personnel ==
- Little Richard – vocals, piano (inaudible except on “California (I’m Coming)” and “The Puppy Dog Song”)
- Lee Allen – tenor saxophone
- Jim Horn – saxophone
- Sneaky Pete Kleinow – pedal steel guitar
- Earl Palmer – drums
- Michael Deasy – slide guitar
- Bob Love – unknown instrument according to Reprise Records
