= Shake It All About (album) =

Studio album by Little Richard
- Released: October 20, 1992
- Recorded: 1991–1992
- Genre: Children's music, rock and roll
- Length: 36:47
- Label: Walt Disney Records
- Producer: Shepard Stern

Little Richard chronology
Lifetime Friend (1986)	Shake It All About (1992)	Little Richard Meets Masayoshi Takanaka (1992)

Professional ratings
Review scores
Source	Rating
AllMusic	3/5 stars
The Indianapolis Star	2.5/4 stars
MusicHound Rock: The Essential Album Guide	2.5/5 stars

Shake It All About is a children's music album by Little Richard, released by Walt Disney Records in 1992. The album followed the success of Richard's rock and roll-based cover of "The Itsy Bitsy Spider", which convinced Disney to allow Richard to record an album of children's songs in his trademark rock and roll style.

Richard also re-recorded his older hit, "Keep A-Knockin'", and the gospel standards, "When the Saints Go Marching In" and "He's Got the Whole World in His Hands".

== Critical reception ==
The A.V. Club wrote that the album "proved that there was pretty much nothing you couldn’t improve by applying Richard’s soaring vocals, distinctive 'whoo!'s and uptempo piano work." The Orlando Sentinel wrote that "Richard's exuberance adds dash to children's standards ... even if the arrangements are heavy on the cheesy synthesized dance beats and give short shrift to his piano." The Chicago Tribune declared: "His innovative version of 'Twinkle, Twinkle Little Star' includes a haunting percussion background, the clear singing voice of a child and additional lyrics that speak of global friendship. Good golly, Miss Molly, this is great music for any age."

== Track listing ==
1. "The Hokey Pokey" – 2:47
2. "On Top of Spaghetti" – 2:56
3. "Old MacDonald Had a Farm" – 3:59
4. "She'll Be Comin' Round the Mountain" – 2:37
5. "Zip-a-Dee-Doo-Dah" – 3:03
6. "Keep A-Knockin'" – 3:00
7. "Twinkle, Twinkle, Little Star" – 3:18
8. "If You're Happy and You Know It" – 3:38
9. "When the Saints Go Marching In" – 3:39
10. "He's Got the Whole World in His Hands" – 2:12
11. "Here We Go Loopty-Loo" – 3:23
12. "Oh Where, Oh Where Has My Little Dog Gone?" – 2:15
