= H. B. Barnum =

American child actor, pianist, record producer and songwriter (born 1936)

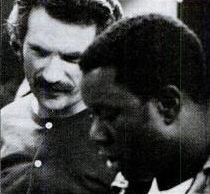
- Barnum on the right with David Axelrod c. 1970

Background information
- Born: Hidle Brown Barnum; July 15, 1936 (age 90); Houston, Texas, U.S.
- Occupations: Musician, arranger, record producer
- Instrument: Piano
- Years active: 1950–present

Hidle Brown Barnum (born July 15, 1936) is an American pianist, arranger, record producer, songwriter, and former child actor.

== Biography ==
After winning a nationwide talent contest at the age of four and starring in the film Valley of the Sun Marches On, Barnum continued his acting career on TV in the Amos 'n' Andy Show, the Jack Benny Show, and others, making his first solo recording as Pee Wee Barnum in 1950.

Barnum then joined doo-wop groups the Dootones and, in late 1955, when Carl Gardner and bass Bobby Nunn left the Robins to form the Coasters for Atlantic, Barnum replaced Bobby Nunn as baritone and bass for the Robins, as well as playing piano for them. This version of the Robins recorded for the Whippet label, where Barnum soon became the A&R man. In 1960, under the pseudonym "Dudley" he recorded "El Pizza", a parody of Marty Robbins' "El Paso". He had the only hit under his own name, the instrumental "Lost Love" which reached number 35 in the United States on Billboard's top singles chart in early 1961. In the same year he recorded the first version of "Nut Rocker", credited to Jack B. Nimble and the Quicks. He also recorded three albums as a singer-pianist during the 1960s.

Since that time Barnum became most widely known as an arranger, for a very wide range of performers including Lou Rawls, Count Basie, O. C. Smith, Frank Sinatra, the Supremes, Donna Loren, Aretha Franklin, Little Richard, Gladys Knight, Melinda Marx, Al Wilson, the Pump Girls, and the Little Tots. Barnum also produced, along with Johnnie Walls of JWP Productions which distributed the record, the 1985 hip-hop comedy song "Rappin' Duke". He also produced "The Fish Song", a rare song by the New Creation, released on Salaam Records. In addition, he co-wrote "Your Love", a 1977 top 20 hit song by Marilyn McCoo and Billy Davis Jr.

Barnum produced an album recorded by the Novells, a Los Angeles area band, titled, That Did It! in 1968. The album re-emerged as an import some 40 years later when it was released in the UK in July 2005 and again in December 2007 by Radioactive Records.

Barnum appears in the 2023 documentary Little Richard: King and Queen of Rock ‘n’ Roll which was broadcast on PBS.

Barnum is the older brother of backup singer Billie Barnum.
