= Senator Nolan Jones =

American musician

Background information
- Born: Senator Nolan Jones; November 9, 1934; Jackson, Mississippi, U.S.
- Died: November 28, 2008 (aged 74) Raymond, Mississippi, U.S.
- Genres: Rhythm and blues, Blues
- Occupations: Singer, songwriter, producer, record label owner
- Years active: 1958-2008
- Labels: Whurley Burley Records, Watch Records, Hot Line Records, Sidra Records, Bell Records, International City Records, Black Patch Records, Shagg Records, Superdome Records, Jenmark Records, JB's Records, and Hep' Me Records

Senator Nolan Jones (November 9, 1934 – November 28, 2008) was an American record company owner, producer, singer, and songwriter who worked in R&B and blues. He recorded and promoted Louisiana and Mississippi performers and songs for more than four decades.

== Early years ==
Senator Nolan Jones was born in Jackson, Mississippi on November 9, 1934. "I was always interested in music," he recalled. “I was a big blues lover, you never could play enough blues for me. I used to duck in the cafes and ice cream parlors on Farish and Fortification streets and listen to people like Buddy Johnson, Muddy Waters, Jimmy Liggins and Louis Jordan on the jukebox. I even saw Elmore James play in Jackson." He moved with his family to New Orleans, Louisiana in 1951. Jones remained in the city after his parents soon returned to Jackson. He worked as a laborer for two years until he was drafted into the Army in 1953. While stationed at Fort Benning, Georgia, Jones performed with the Desperados, a vocal group whose members included Oscar Toney Jr. and Jo Jo Benson. "I joined a group called the Desperados as a vocalist", he remembered. "We worked around Augusta and Atlanta." The band opened shows for national acts such as The "5" Royales and Hank Ballard and The Midnighters at area clubs.

Discharged from the Army in 1957, Jones returned to New Orleans. He was one of a number of Mississippi musicians who settled and worked in the Crescent City. This group includes Eddie “Guitar Slim” Jones, Babe Stovall, and Little Freddie King. Jones worked the edges of the city's music scene, occasionally sitting in at local clubs like the Club Tiajuana and Dew Drop Inn. He helped Al Johnson write "You Done Me Wrong", which Johnson recorded in 1958 for Ron Records.

== 1960s ==
Jones began to frequent Joe Assunto's One Stop Record Shop at 330 South Rampart Street in the early 1960s. Assunto was the brother-in-law of Joe Ruffino, owner of the Ric and Ron record labels. Ric Records artists Professor Longhair and Johnny Adams were among the musicians who could often be found at One Stop. Assunto employed both of them in the store at various times sweeping, packing, shipping, and making deliveries. Jones convinced One Stop clerk Eugene "Whurley Burley” Burlison that he might profit from his association with Assunto if he launched his own record label. This led to Jones recording "Let Yourself Go" backed with "Call The Sheriff" on Whurley Burley Records in 1963. Assunto teamed with Henry Hildebrand, Jr., owner of the record distribution company All South Distributors, in 1963 to found Watch Records. They employed Wardell Quezergue and Earl King, two top local arranger/producers. Jones' second studio session, with Quezergue at the helm, generated "I Think Of You" backed with "Sugar Dee" for the Watch label in 1965 . Earl King noted, "Senator been tryin' to get rid of "I Think Of You" since 1954. He auditioned that song for Johnny Vincent, Joe Ruffino, and Eddie Bo's label." Jones recorded "Whatcha Gonna Do" backed with "Boston Fleet", a Wardell Quezergue-produced release, for Hot Line Records in 1965. Writer Michael Hurtt noted, "'Whatcha Gonna Do' reveals a jarring side of the Senator, who's amped with the sweat-drenched dedication of a revivalist preacher, testifying all the way to kingdom come." Jones continued to record sporadically through the 1960s for a handful of labels including Hot Line Records, Sapphire Records, Bell Records, International City Records, and his own Shagg Records label. "Sweet Thing" backed with the topical "Miniskirt Dance" was leased to Bell Records in 1967 for national distribution, but failed to chart. Jones said that despite insignificant sales, his records kept him in demand for live performances.

Realizing he was not going to be successful as a singer, Jones turned his hand to recording and promoting New Orleans artists. He saw a wealth of local talent that was not being recorded. Local artists, he said, "were stealing the show from national acts" who had recorded hit records. Jones started Black Patch, his first record label, in 1968. The label's name was a reference to the patch he wore over his left eye, lost in an accident. Jones signed Rockie Charles to Black Patch Records, after Charles had been turned down by Dave Bartholomew of Imperial Records and Allen Toussaint of Minit Records and Instant Records. Charles, who worked as a tugboat captain on the Mississippi River, had learned the guitar from his father, a bluesman who played juke joints in Plaquemines Parish. Jones took Charles into the studio to record "Riccasha" backed with "Sinking Like A Ship". The record launched Charles' musical career despite generating only local interest. He later backed O.V. Wright, Otis Redding, Percy Sledge, and others on the road. Jones folded the Black Patch label when Charles' record failed to sell.

== 1970s ==
Jones' launched a second label on the heels of the closing of Black Patch he called Shagg Records, after the nickname his old friend Eugene "Whurley Burley" Burlison from One Stop Record Shop gave him. The first Shagg recording was "Kid Stuff" backed with "As Sure As You're Born" by the Barons. He recorded a handful of releases on artists Guitar Ray, Vickie Labat, Donald Lee Richardson, and under his own name. He made an arrangement with Cosimo Matassa to distribute the Shagg releases he recorded at Matassa's studio.

Jones started several labels in the succeeding years, eventually consolidating them under his Erica Productions. His business was an office in the Masonic building on St. Bernard Avenue. "As I got more artists, I didn't want to go to a radio station with seven records on the same label," Jones pointed out, "because I know the deejays would just say 'Oh I can't play all of those records, they're on the same label.' So I started new labels and I switched the colors on the record labels to make them look different." A street-smart hustler, he recorded a lot of New Orleans talent that might have otherwise gone unheard. A list of Jones' labels includes Black Patch, Shagg, Hep’ Me, Jenmark, Super Dome, JB's, Gamma, Paid, and Mode. He often kept several labels active at the same time.

Jones not only recorded New Orleans talent who would have otherwise gone unrecorded such as Rockie Charles and Charles Brimmer, but up-and-coming stars such as Walter "Wolfman" Washington and Bobby Powell. He also recorded well-known local musicians Johnny Adams, Tommy Ridgely, Chris Kenner, Chuck Carbo, and Barbara George. Jones produced some New Orleans artists in Baton Rouge at Lionel Whitfield's studio. After Allen Toussaint and record man Marshall Sehorn opened Sea-Saint Studios in 1973 the studio did well producing hits like "Lady Marmalade" for LaBelle, and recording a succession of well-known artists including Paul McCartney, Paul Simon, Rod Stewart, John Mayall, and Elvis Costello. In 1978 they brought in engineer Cosimo Matassa, and opened the studio to independent producers, among them Senator Jones. Jones struck a deal with Marshall Sehorn that exchanged a percentage of his record sales for studio time at Sea-Saint.

In 1974, Jones paid musician Willie Norman "Bill" Sinegal $65 for the rights to his song "Second Line". Sinegal had recorded the song in 1964 with the Skyliners- including New Orleans jazz musicians James Rivers on sax and Milton Batiste on trumpet. He said he borrowed the intro from Dave Bartholomew's "Good Jax Boogie", and the body of the song from "Joe Avery's Blues", a traditional jazz number. Batiste said it also had elements of "Picou's Blues" and "Whuppin’ Blues". Sinegal and the Skyliners' recording stirred some interest, but when Jones re-recorded it with Stop, Inc. the song took off. It became a perennial Mardi Gras favorite.

== 1980s ==
Rap music had become popular with young black fans in New Orleans by the early 1980s. In 1983, Jones released one of the first rap records to come out of the city on his Super Dome Records label. The twelve-inch single by Parlez was titled “Make It, Shake It, Do It Good!”, a Carnival-themed song with references to Mardi Gras Indians, the Zulu Parade, and other Mardi Gras traditions. By 1985, the local radio market had become dominated by stations controlled by corporate interests and long distance owners airing national playlists. With no chance of being broadcast, Jones could not sell his artists' records to distributors and record stores. He was out of the business for a few years before moving back to Jackson, Mississippi. There he worked for a short time with Jackson music men Johnny Vincent and George Jackson. He also did radio promotion for Jackson-based Malaco Records for two years.

== Later years ==
In the 1990s, Jones partnered with Warren Hildebrand of Mardi Gras Records to record and promote Sweet Miss Coffy, Peggy Scott-Adams, the Love Doctor, Sir Charles Jones and others on his Hep' Me Records label, for the down home radio market in a genre known as Southern soul. Sir Charles recalled, "When we came to Jackson we were homeless and hungry. Senator Jones (no relation) took us under his wing, and with faith in our ability and confidence in our skill, we released our first CD" on his Hep' Me Records (now a subsidiary of Mardi Gras Records). As "Uncle Bobo", Jones was the host of a late-night radio program on WMPR in Jackson.

Senator Jones died at his home at the age of 74 on November 28, 2008.

== Discography ==
New Orleans, La. 1963

- "Let Yourself Go" b/w "Call The Sheriff" - Whurley Burley Records 101

New Orleans, La. 1965

- "Sugar Dee" b/w "I Think Of You" - Watch Records 6337

New Orleans, La. 1966

- "Whatcha Gonna Do" b/w "Boston Fleet" - Hot Line Records 120

New Orleans, La. 1966

- "Give Me Another Chance" b/w "A Dream" - Sidra (E) 9014

New Orleans, La. 1966

- "My Baby's Back" b/w "Baby It's Too Late" - Sapphire Records 913

New Orleans, La. 1968

- "Sweet Thing" b/w "Miniskirt Dance" - Bell Records 687

New Orleans, La. 1968

- "Do You Love Me" b/w "Who's Loving Her Now" - Shagg Records 713
- "The Fat Man" b/w "Today And Tonight" - Shagg Records 801

New Orleans, La. 1971

- "Eenie Meenie Miney Minnie & Moe" b/w "Country Soul" - International City Records 729

Memphis, Tenn. and Pearl, Ms. 1998

- (as Uncle Bo-Bo) "Did You Sleep With Mary?" b/w "Catfish Pond"- Hep' Me Records 1000
- (as Senator Jones & His Louisiana Red Hot Crawfish Orchestra) "Melencholy" (sic) "Baby" - Hep' Me Records
