= Ridgley =

Ridgley may refer to:

== Places ==
- Ridgley, Missouri, U.S.
- Ridgley, Tasmania, Australia

== People ==
=== Given name ===
- Francis Ridgley Cotton (1895–1960), American prelate of the Roman Catholic Church
- Ridgley C. Powers (1836–1912), Union officer in the American Civil War and a Mississippi politician
- William Ridgley Morris (1811–1889), American politician and diplomat

=== Surname ===
- Bob Ridgley (fl. 2003–2011), Canadian politician
- Buck Ridgley, American Negro league baseball player in the 1920s
- Henry Ridgley (1635–1710), an early settler of Maryland, U.S.
- Ishbel MacDonald (1903–1982), also known as Ishbel Ridgley, daughter of British prime minister Ramsay MacDonald
- Sammy Ridgley (born 1943), American activist and R&B artist
- Thomas Ridgley (c. 1667–1734), English independent theologian
- Tommy Ridgley (1925–1999), American R&B singer and bandleader

== See also ==
- Ridgeley (disambiguation)
- Ridgely (disambiguation)
- Ridgley Methodist Episcopal Church, in Landover, Prince George's County, Maryland, U.S.
