= Carnival Time =

Carnival Time may refer to:

- Al "Carnival Time" Johnson (born 1939), American singer and piano player
- Carnival Time (song), a Mardi Gras-themed song
- "Carnival Time" (Treme), an episode from the TV drama
- Carnival Time, a 1936 musical short film directed by Milton Schwarzwald
- Carnival Time, a 1962 Disney TV show featuring Donald Duck and Ludwig Von Drake
