= Justin Wellington =

Papua New Guinea singer

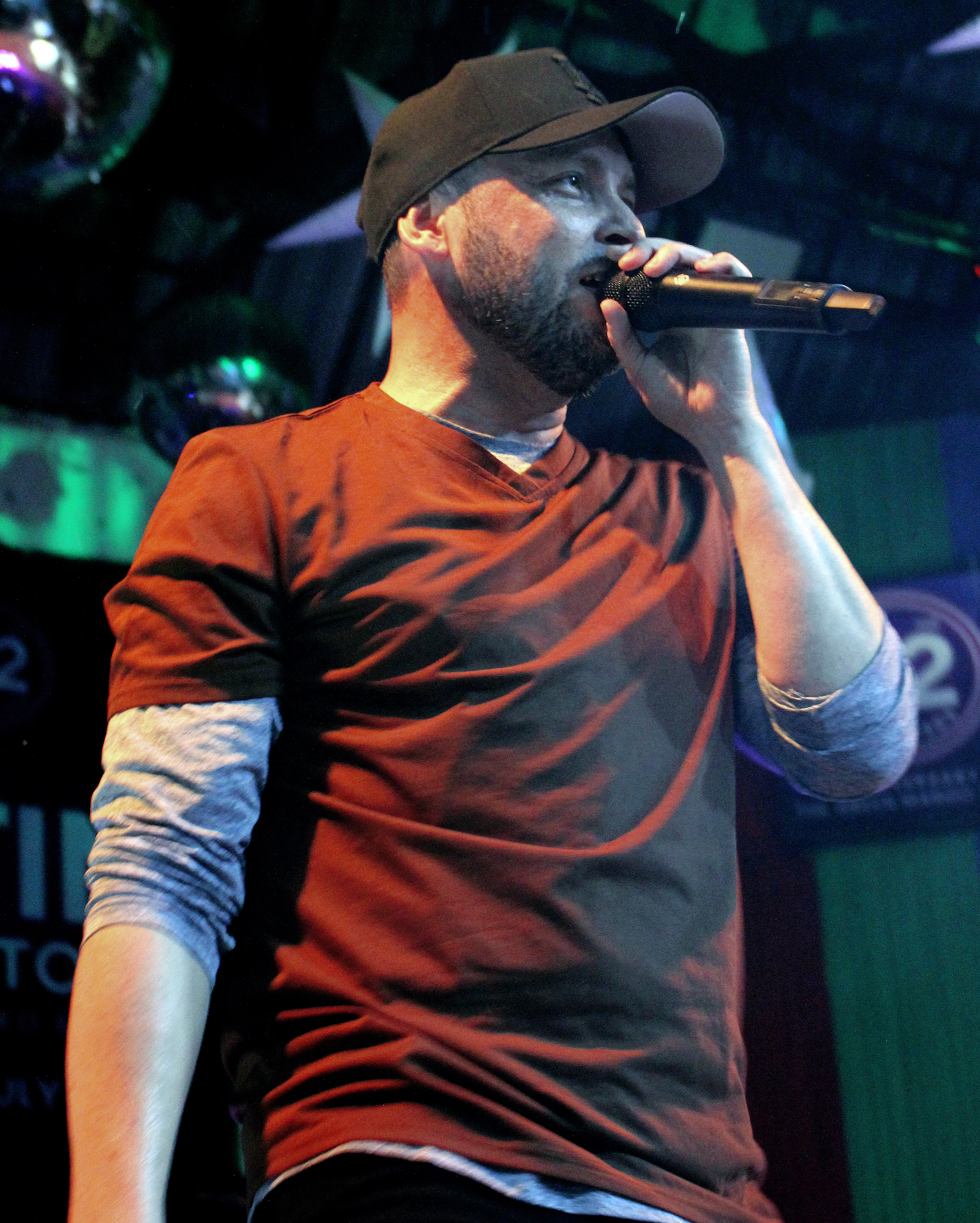
- Wellington performing at The Green Mango Club in 2022

Background information
- Born: Justin Wellington
- Origin: Papua New Guinea, Australia
- Genres: Pop, reggae, R&B, dancehall, island music
- Occupations: Singer; songwriter
- Years active: 2002–present
- Labels: Mangrove; Sony Music

Justin Wellington is a Papua New Guinean singer, best known for his version of "Iko Iko" as "Iko Iko (My Bestie)", together with Small Jam. His style is a blend of pop, reggae, R&B, dancehall, and island music. He has released three studio albums.

== Early life and education ==
Justin Wellington was born in Papua New Guinea to Australian-born parents who had immigrated to PNG.

He attended schools in Texas, US, and in BC, Canada.

== Career ==
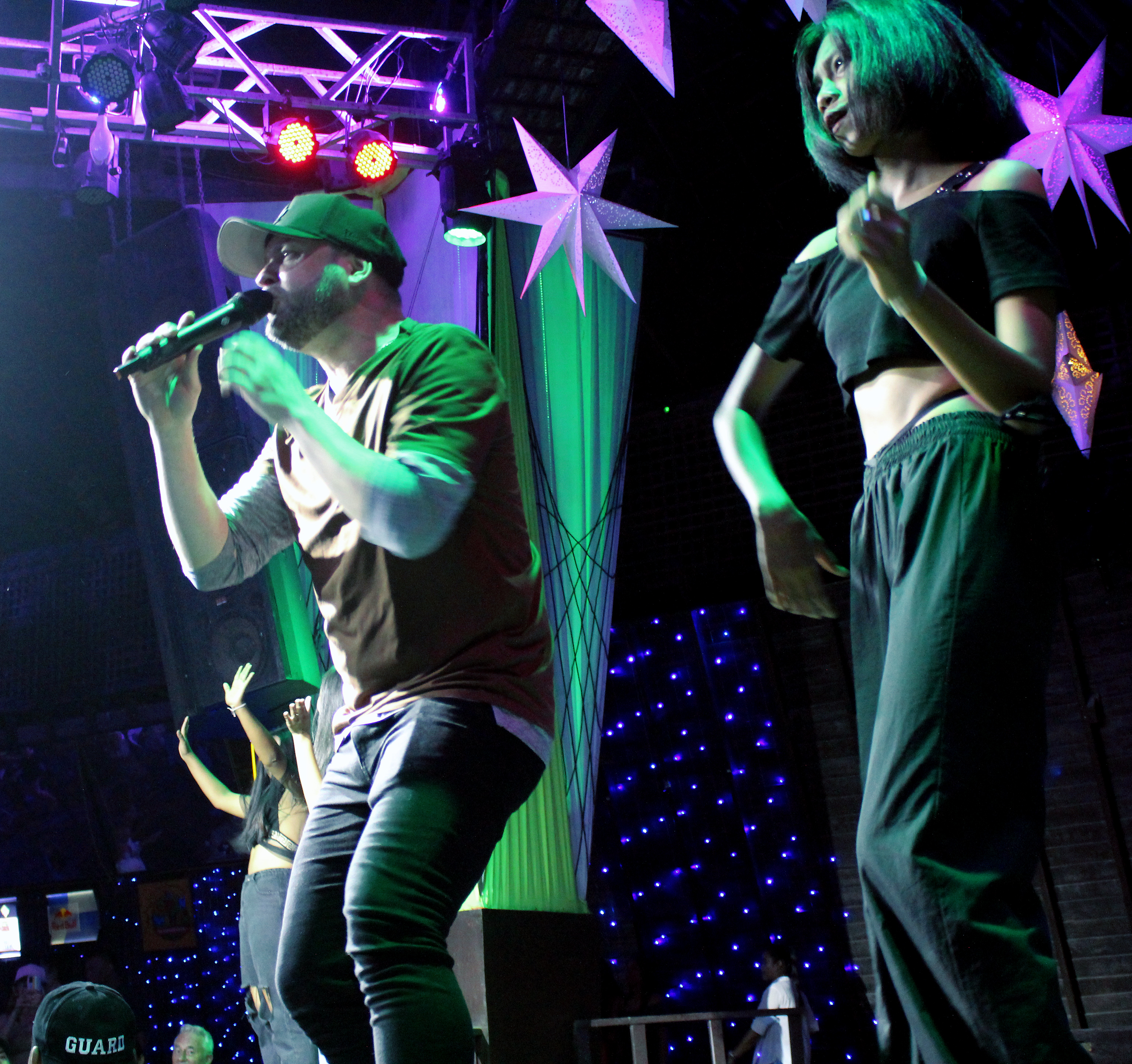
Wellington's performance, 30 July 2022 in The Green Mango Club, Ko Samui, Thailand

Wellington began working as an R&B and reggae pop singer. Hit singles include "I Wanna Give You Some Lovin'", "Better Off", "One Night With You", "Much Love", "Fire", "In Love with U", "Runaway", "Tell Me", "Reminiscing", "Rain of Morobe", and others. He has worked with many Papua New Guinea artists, such as AK-47, Tattz from NakaBlood, Jokema, O-Shen, Robbie T, Mekere Crew, Steven M, Gravity, and DJ Travy.

His musical style is a blend of pop, reggae, R&B, dancehall and island music.

Wellington's international breakthrough came with a cover of "Iko Iko", originally recorded by James "Sugar Boy" Crawford in 1953 and popularised by The Dixie Cups, and many covers from the 1980s onwards. Wellington's adapted version of the song, "Iko Iko (My Bestie)", was released featuring Solomon Islands group Small Jam in 2017. It received worldwide attention as part of the social platform TikTok challenge. As a result, the cover was released by Sony Music UK on 3 June 2019, and started to gain international popularity in 2021. His version makes various changes to the lyrics of the verses, and has its own original sections, but keeps the chorus the same. It was later added alongside the TikTok dance into the video game Fortnite Battle Royale.

== Recognition and awards ==
Wellington was nominated for "International Revelation of the Year" during the 2021 NRJ Music Awards.

== Discography ==
=== Albums ===
- 2005: Much Love (Mangrove Productions)
- 2008: JW (Mangrove Productions)
- 2010: Reign of Morobe (Mangrove Productions)

=== Singles ===
Year	Title	Chart positions										Certification
Year	Title	AUT	BEL	FRA	DEN	GER	ITA	NED	SWE	SWI	UK	Certification
2021	"Iko Iko (My Bestie)" (feat. Small Jam)	5	3	10	22	7	21	7	13	5	99	AUT: Platinum; ITA: Platinum; SWI: Gold

=== Other songs ===
- 2005: "I Wanna Give You Some Lovin'"
- 2005: "Much Love"
- 2008: "Madina"
- 2009: "In Love With U"
- 2011: "Run Away"
- 2011: "Island Girl"
- 2011: "Fire"
- 2011: "Your Love" (feat. Sharzy)
- 2011: "Rain of Morobe" (feat. O-Shen)
- 2011: "Island Sound" (feat. K & Nela Music & D-Witty)
- 2012: "Christmas Is Finally Here" (feat. LiveBoys)
- 2013: "Need You" (feat. Pou Jackson)
- 2014: "Reminiscin" (feat. Gravity and Funky)
- 2015: "Long Way Back (To Your Heart)" (feat. Jokema)
- 2017: "Iko Iko (My Bestie)" (feat. Small Jam)
- 2017: "Island Moon" (feat. Jahboy)
- 2018: "My Girl" (feat. Leebonz & K-Dawg)
- 2020: "Sweet Mama" (feat. Papa Cidy)
- 2020: "She Don't Know" (feat. Dezine)
- 2020: "Show Me How"
- 2021: "Iko Iko (Ryan Freeston Remix)"
