= Iko Iko =

Song written by James "Sugar Boy" Crawford

Single by James "Sugar Boy" Crawford and his Cane Cutters
- Released: 1953 (as "Jock-A-Mo")
- Genre: Traditional New Orleans music
- Label: Checker 787
- Songwriter: James Crawford

Official audio
- "Iko Iko" on YouTube

"Iko Iko" (/ˈaɪkoʊ ˈaɪkoʊ/) is a much-covered song from New Orleans, United States, originally titled "Jock-A-Mo" when released in 1953.

The song tells of a parade collision between two tribes of Mardi Gras Indians, and the traditional confrontation. The song, under the original title "Jock-A-Mo", was written and released in 1953 as a single by James "Sugar Boy" Crawford and his Cane Cutters, but it failed to make the charts. It was subsequently covered many times.

The song was first made popular as "Iko Iko" in 1965 by an American girl group, the Dixie Cups, who scored an international hit with it. In 1967, as part of a lawsuit settlement between Crawford and the Dixie Cups, the trio were given part songwriting credit for the song. In 1972, Dr. John reached the Billboard Hot 100 with his version of "Iko Iko".

In the UK, two competing versions of the song were released in 1982—one by the all-female group the Belle Stars and the other by Scottish singer Natasha England. While the Belle Stars' version peaked at 35 in the UK, Natasha's version reached the top 10. However, the Belle Stars version later reached the US Top 20 after being included in the 1988 film Rain Man. Cyndi Lauper covered the song in 1986.

The Grateful Dead began incorporating “Iko Iko” into their live shows in 1977. The song became a staple of their many tours throughout the 1980s, with the band playing it over 180 times until Jerry Garcia’s death in 1995.

"Iko Iko" became a European hit again in 2001 after being covered by the German dance act Captain Jack. An adaptation by Papua New Guinea artist Justin Wellington under the title "Iko Iko (My Bestie)", featuring the Solomon Island duo Small Jam, became an international hit in 2021 after a successful TikTok challenge.

== Sugar Boy and his Cane Cutters version ==
=== Background ===
The song was originally recorded and released as a single in November 1953 by James Crawford as "Sugar Boy and his Cane Cutters", on Checker Records (Checker 787). The single features Dave Lastie on tenor saxophone. Crawford's version of the song did not make the charts. The story tells of a "spy boy" (i.e. a lookout for one band of Indians) encountering the "flag boy" or guidon carrier for another "tribe". He threatens to "set the flag on fire". Crawford set phrases chanted by Mardi Gras Indians to music for the song. Crawford himself states that he has no idea what the words mean, and that he originally sang the phrase "Chock-a-mo", but the title was misheard by Chess Records and Checker Records president Leonard Chess, who misspelled it as "Jock-a-mo" for the record's release.

=== "Sugar Boy" Crawford's story ===
James Crawford gave a 2002 interview with OffBeat Magazine discussing the song's meaning:

Interviewer: How did you construct 'Jock-A-Mo?'

Crawford: It came from two Indian chants that I put music to. "Iko Iko" was like a victory chant that the Indians would shout. "Jock-A-Mo" was a chant that was called when the Indians went into battle. I just put them together and made a song out of them. Really it was just like "Lawdy Miss Clawdy." That was a phrase everybody in New Orleans used. Lloyd Price just added music to it and it became a hit. I was just trying to write a catchy song....

Interviewer: Listeners wonder what 'Jock-A-Mo' means. Some music scholars say it translates in Mardi Gras Indian lingo as 'Kiss my ass' and I've read where some think 'Jock-A-Mo' was a court jester. What does it mean?

Crawford: I really don't know. (laughs)

== The Dixie Cups version ==
"Iko Iko"

Single by the Dixie Cups

from the album Chapel of Love
- B-side: "Gee Baby Gee" or "I'm Gonna Get You Yet"
- Released: March 1965
- Recorded: 1964
- Genre: R&B; Bubblegum pop; Minimal
- Length: 2:05
- Label: Red Bird
- Songwriters: James Crawford; Barbara Hawkins; Rosa Hawkins; Joan Johnson
- Producers: Jerry Leiber; Mike Stoller; Ellie Greenwich; Jeff Barry

The Dixie Cups singles chronology
"Little Bell" (1964)	"Iko Iko" (1965)	"Gee the Moon Is Shining Bright" (1965)

Official audio
- "Iko Iko" on YouTube

=== Background ===
The Dixie Cups' version was the result of an unplanned jam in a New York City recording studio where they began an impromptu version of "Iko Iko", accompanying themselves with drumsticks on an aluminum chair, a studio ashtray and a Coke bottle. After their producers cleaned up the track, the single was then released in March 1965. The Dixie Cups scored an international hit single with "Iko Iko" in May 1965 on the Billboard Hot 100 chart where their version peaked at number 20 and spent 10 weeks on the Top 100. The song also charted at number 23 on the UK Singles Chart and peaked at number 20 on the R&B Chart. In Canada "Iko Iko" reached number 26 on the RPM Chart. It was the third single taken from their debut studio album Chapel of Love issued on Red Bird Records in August 1964.

The Dixie Cups had learned "Iko, Iko" from hearing the Hawkins sisters' grandmother sing it, but they knew little about the origin of the song and so the original authorship credit went to the members, Barbara Ann Hawkins, her sister Rosa Lee Hawkins, and their cousin Joan Marie Johnson.

The Dixie Cups' version was later included on the soundtrack to the 1987 film The Big Easy. This same version was also used on the soundtrack of the 2005 film The Skeleton Key. In 2009, a version based on the Dixie Cups' was used in an ad for Lipton Rainforest Alliance Iced Tea.

=== Legal battles ===
After the Dixie Cups version of "Iko Iko" was a hit in 1965, they and their record label, Red Bird Records, were sued by James Crawford, who claimed that "Iko Iko" was the same as his composition "Jock-a-mo". Although the Dixie Cups denied that the two compositions were similar, the lawsuit resulted in a settlement in 1967 with Crawford making no claim to authorship or ownership of "Iko Iko", but being credited 25% for public performances, such as on radio, of "Iko Iko" in the United States. A comparison of the two recordings demonstrates the shared lyric and melody between the two songs, though the arrangements are different in tempo, instrumentation and harmony. Crawford's rationale for the settlement was motivated by years of legal battles with no royalties. In the end, he stated, "I don't even know if I really am getting my just dues. I just figure 50 percent of something is better than 100 percent of nothing."

In the 1990s, the Dixie Cups became aware that another group of people were claiming authorship of "Iko Iko". Their ex-manager Joe Jones and his family filed a copyright registration in 1991, alleging that they wrote the song in 1963. Joe Jones successfully licensed "Iko Iko" outside of North America. The Dixie Cups filed a lawsuit against Joe Jones. The trial took place in New Orleans and the Dixie Cups were represented by well-known music attorney Oren Warshavsky before Senior Federal Judge Peter Beer. The jury returned a unanimous verdict on March 6, 2002, affirming that the Dixie Cups were the only writers of "Iko Iko" and granting them more money than they were seeking. The Fifth Circuit Court of Appeals upheld the jury verdict and sanctioned Joe Jones.

=== Chart performance ===
Chart (1965–1966)	Peak position
Canada RPM	26
UK Singles Chart	23
US Billboard Hot 100	20
US Cashbox Top 100	19
US R&B Chart	20

== Dr. John version ==
"Iko Iko"

Single by Dr. John

from the album Dr. John's Gumbo
- B-side: "Huey Smith Medley"
- Released: March 1972
- Recorded: 1972
- Genre: Rhythm and Blues
- Length: 3:10
- Label: Atco
- Songwriters: Barbara Hawkins; Rosa Hawkins; Joan Johnson; James Crawford
- Producers: Jerry Wexler; Harold Battiste

Dr. John singles chronology
"Wash, Mama, Wash" (1970)	"Iko Iko" (1972)	"Right Place Wrong Time" (1973)

Official audio
- "Iko Iko" on YouTube

=== Background ===
New Orleans singer and pianist Dr. John covered "Iko Iko" in 1972 for his fifth studio album Dr. John's Gumbo. Released as a single in March 1972 on Atco Records, his version of the song charted at number 71 on the Billboard Hot 100 chart. It was produced by Jerry Wexler and Harold Battiste. The "Iko Iko" story is told by Dr. John in the liner notes to his 1972 album, Dr. John's Gumbo, in which he covers New Orleans R&B classics:

The song was written and recorded back in the early 1950s by a New Orleans singer named James Crawford who worked under the name of Sugar Boy & the Cane Cutters. It was recorded in the 1960s by the Dixie Cups for Jerry Leiber & Mike Stoller's Red Bird Records, but the format we're following here is Sugar Boy's original. Also in the group were Professor Longhair on piano, Jake Myles, Big Boy Myles, Irv Bannister on guitar, and Eugene 'Bones' Jones on drums. The group was also known as the Chipaka Shaweez. The song was originally called 'Jockamo,' and it has a lot of Creole patois in it. Jockamo means 'jester' in the old myth. It is Mardi Gras music, and the Shaweez was one of many Mardi Gras groups who dressed up in far out Indian costumes and came on as Indian tribes. The tribes used to hang out on Claiborne Avenue and used to get juiced up there getting ready to perform and 'second line' in their own special style during Mardi Gras. That's dead and gone because there's a freeway where those grounds used to be. The tribes were like social clubs who lived all year for Mardi Gras, getting their costumes together. Many of them were musicians, gamblers, hustlers and pimps.

Dr. John, playing himself, performs the song in the "movie" Polynesian Town on the May 22, 1981, episode of the Canadian comedy show SCTV.

Dr. John performed the song during halftime of the 2008 NBA All-Star Game in New Orleans and again in 2014.

=== Chart performance ===
Chart (1972)	Peak position
U.S. Billboard Hot 100	71

== Natasha version ==
"Iko Iko"

Single by Natasha

from the album Captured
- B-side: "I Should Have Known"; "I Still Love You" (12")
- Released: 1982 (UK)
- Recorded: 1982
- Genre: Pop
- Label: Towerbell
- Songwriters: Barbara Hawkins; Rosa Hawkins; Joan Johnson
- Producer: Tom Newman

Natasha singles chronology
"Strangest Feeling" (1981)	"Iko Iko" (1982)	"The Boom Boom Room" (1982)

Official audio
- "Iko Iko" on YouTube

=== Background ===
The most successful charting version in the UK was recorded by the Scottish singer Natasha (full name Natasha England), whose version reached number 10 on the UK singles chart in 1982. Natasha's single was one of two competing versions of "Iko Iko" in the Official Singles Chart Top 40 of week ending 19 June 1982, a chart run-down which saw Natasha at number 24, eleven places higher than the version released by The Belle Stars on Stiff Records. The song also charted highly in Ireland, Israel and New Zealand. The single was produced by Tom Newman. A remix of the single was released in 2007, and Natasha's version enjoyed a resurgence in 2014 when it was included on the soundtrack to the highest-grossing Italian film of 2014, A Boss in the Living Room (Un Boss in Salotto).

=== Chart performance ===
==== Weekly charts ====
Chart (1982)	Peak position
Ireland (IRMA)	7
New Zealand (Recorded Music NZ)	5
UK Singles (Official Charts)	10

==== Year-end charts ====
Chart (1982)	Position
New Zealand (Recorded Music NZ)	25

== The Belle Stars version ==
"Iko Iko"

Single by The Belle Stars

from the album The Belle Stars/Rain Man Soundtrack
- B-side: "The Reason" (UK); "Las Vegas" by Hans Zimmer (U.S.)
- Released: 1982
- Recorded: 1982
- Genre: Pop
- Length: 2:49
- Label: Stiff (UK), Capitol (U.S.)
- Songwriters: Barbara Hawkins; Rosa Hawkins; Joan Johnson
- Producer: Brian Tench

The Belle Stars singles chronology
"Another Latin Love Song" (1981)	"Iko Iko" (1982)	"The Clapping Song" (1982)

Official audio
- "Iko Iko" on YouTube

=== Background ===
In 1982, the British all-female band the Belle Stars had a minor UK chart hit with their cover of "Iko Iko", which reached number 35. The track was produced by Brian Tench and was also featured on the band's eponymous debut album, The Belle Stars, which reached number 15 on the UK Albums Chart. The single was released almost simultaneously as the Natasha England version, which went on to be a Top 10 hit. However, after it was included on the soundtrack to the 1988 film Rain Man, starring Tom Cruise and Dustin Hoffman, the Belle Stars version was released in the US, hitting No. 14 and No. 16 on the Billboard Hot 100 and Cash Box Top 100 charts, respectively. The single was issued on Capitol Records. Their version of the song is in the opening scene of the film.

The Belle Stars version was also included in the 1997 film Knockin' on Heaven's Door and The Hangover in 2009.

=== Music video ===
A music video was used to promote the single. The music video features scenes from the Rain Man movie as well as Belle Stars lead singer Jennie McKeown wearing a black outfit with blue dangling treble clefs and bleach blond dreadlocks. Jennie is also accompanied by four dancing girls in colorful outfits and a dancing man trying to persuade a subdued man. The original music video uses the 1989 remix which samples "One, two, three, four, hit it!" from Kurtis Blow's 1984 song AJ Scratch and Woo! Yeah! from Lyn Collins's Think (About It). On the bridge, a line from the Thunderbirds episode Ricochet is also heard on the remix.

=== Chart performance ===
==== Weekly charts ====
Chart (1982–1989)	Peak position
New Zealand (Recorded Music NZ)	35
UK Singles (Official Charts)	35

Chart (1989)	Peak position
Australia (ARIA)	7
Austria (Ö3 Austria Top 40)	6
Canada (RPM)	42
New Zealand (Recorded Music NZ)	5
Switzerland (Schweizer Hitparade)	6
UK Singles (OCC)	98
US Billboard Hot 100	14
US Cash Box Top 100	16
West Germany (GfK)	30

==== Year-end charts ====
Chart (1989)	Position
Australia (ARIA)	46
New Zealand (Recorded Music NZ)	31

== Captain Jack version ==
"Iko Iko"

Single by Captain Jack

from the album Top Secret
- Released: 2001
- Recorded: 2001
- Genre: Eurodance
- Length: 3:13
- Label: E-Park
- Songwriters: Barbara Hawkins; Rosa Hawkins; Joan Johnson; James Crawford
- Producers: Udo Niebergall; Eric Sneo

Captain Jack singles chronology
"Only You" (2000)	"Iko Iko" (2001)	"Say Captain Say Wot" (2001)

Official video
- "Iko Iko" on YouTube

=== Background ===
German Eurodance act Captain Jack recorded a cover version of "Iko Iko" for their fourth studio album, Top Secret in 2001. It was released on E-Park Records. The single was produced by Udo Niebergall and Eric Sneo. Captain Jack's version was a hit in several countries, reaching number 22 in Germany, number 62 in Switzerland and peaking at number 16 in Austria.

=== Chart performance ===
Chart (2001)	Peak position
Austria (Ö3 Austria Top 40)	16
Germany (GfK)	22
Poland Airplay (Music & Media)	8
Switzerland (Schweizer Hitparade)	62

== Justin Wellington version ==
"Iko Iko (My Bestie)"

Single by Justin Wellington featuring Small Jam
- Released: June 3, 2019
- Recorded: 2017
- Length: 3:02
- Label: Sony Music UK
- Songwriters: James Crawford; Barbara Hawkins; Rosa Hawkins; Joan Johnson
- Producer: Matthew Adcock

Justin Wellington singles chronology
"My Girl" (2018)	"Iko Iko (My Bestie)" (2019)	"Sweet Mama" (2020)

Small Jam singles chronology
"Mingling" (2018)	"Iko Iko (My Bestie)" (2019)	"Za Lame" (2020)

Music video
- "Iko Iko" on YouTube

=== Background ===
Papua New Guinean singer Justin Wellington recorded his version of "Iko Iko" in 2017, featuring Solomon Islands group Small Jam. It was not a strict cover but rather an adaptation. The track was released by Sony Music UK on June 3, 2019, and started to gain popularity in 2021 after it went viral on social platform TikTok. This version makes various changes to the lyrics of some verses, and has its own musical original sections, but keeps the chorus the same. It was later added alongside the TikTok dance into the video game Fortnite Battle Royale. The track has proven very successful charting high internationally in many countries.

=== Other Justin Wellington versions ===
- "Iko Iko (My Bestie)" - Justin Wellington & Digital Farm Animals feat. Small Jam
- "Iko Iko (My Bestie) (Down Lo Remix)" - Justin Wellington feat. Small Jam
- "Iko Iko (My Bestie) (Imanbek Remix) - Justin Wellington feat. Small Jam
- "Iko Iko (My Bestie) (Summer 2021 Version)" (with an alternative music video)
- "Iko Iko (My Bestie) - Justin Wellington & Pedro Capó feat. Small Jam

=== Chart performance ===
==== Weekly charts ====
Chart (2021–2022)	Peak position
Australia (ARIA)	86
Austria (Ö3 Austria Top 40)	5
Belgium (Ultratop 50 Flanders)	3
Belgium (Ultratop 50 Wallonia)	2
Canada (Canadian Hot 100)	49
Czech Republic Airplay (ČNS IFPI)	40
Denmark (Tracklisten)	22
France (SNEP)	10
Germany (GfK)	7
Germany Airplay (BVMI)	1
Global 200 (Billboard)	68
Hungary (Dance Top 40)	38
Hungary (Rádiós Top 40)	2
Hungary (Single Top 40)	8
Iceland (Tónlistinn)	27
Italy (FIMI)	16
Netherlands (Dutch Top 40)	4
Netherlands (Single Top 100)	7
Poland Airplay (ZPAV)	5
Portugal (AFP)	54
San Marino (SMRRTV Top 50)	4
Slovakia Airplay (ČNS IFPI)	5
Slovakia Singles Digital (ČNS IFPI)	43
Sweden (Sverigetopplistan)	13
Switzerland (Schweizer Hitparade)	5
UK Singles (Official Charts)	99

==== Year-end charts ====
Chart (2021)	Position
Austria (Ö3 Austria Top 40)	22
Belgium (Ultratop Flanders)	22
Belgium (Ultratop Wallonia)	16
Denmark (Tracklisten)	99
France (SNEP)	42
Germany (Official German Charts)	32
Hungary (Rádiós Top 40)	51
Hungary (Single Top 40)	39
Italy (FIMI)	61
Netherlands (Dutch Top 40)	44
Netherlands (Single Top 100)	55
Poland (ZPAV)	49
Sweden (Sverigetopplistan)	61
Switzerland (Schweizer Hitparade)	33

Chart (2022)	Position
Belgium (Ultratop 50 Flanders)	136
Belgium (Ultratop 50 Wallonia)	192

=== Certifications ===
Region	Certification	Certified units/sales
Austria (IFPI Austria)	2× Platinum	60,000^{‡}
Belgium (BRMA)	Gold	20,000^{‡}
Denmark (IFPI Danmark)	Platinum	90,000^{‡}
France (SNEP)	Diamond	333,333^{‡}
Germany (BVMI)	Gold	200,000^{‡}
Italy (FIMI)	2× Platinum	140,000^{‡}
New Zealand (RMNZ)	Gold	15,000^{‡}
Poland (ZPAV)	2× Platinum	100,000^{‡}
Portugal (AFP)	Gold	5,000^{‡}
Spain (Promusicae)	Platinum	60,000^{‡}
Switzerland (IFPI Switzerland)	Platinum	20,000^{‡}
United Kingdom (BPI)	Silver	200,000^{‡}
^{‡} Sales+streaming figures based on certification alone.

== Translations ==
Linguists and historians have proposed a variety of origins for the seemingly nonsensical chorus, suggesting that the words may come from a melange of cultures.

=== From Louisiana Creole ===
An interpretation in Louisiana Creole French is:

Ena! Ena!
Akout, akout, an déyè
Chaque amour fi nou wa na né
Chaque amour fi na né

Translation:

Hey now! Hey now!
Listen, listen at the back
All our love made our king be born
All our love made it happen.

=== From Mobilian Jargon ===
Linguist Geoffrey D. Kimball derives the lyrics of the song in part from Mobilian Jargon, an extinct American Indian trade language consisting mostly of Choctaw and Chickasaw words and once used by Native Americans, Blacks, and European settlers and their descendants in the Gulf Coast Region. In Mobilian Jargon, čokəma fehna (interpreted as jockomo feeno) was a commonly used phrase, meaning 'very good'.

Another possible translation interprets the third and fourth lines as:

Chokma finha an dan déyè
Chokma finha ane.

Translation:

It's very good at the rear
It's a very good year.

Chickasaw words chokma ('it's good') and finha ('very'), Creole an dan déyè from French Creole an dans déyè ('at the back'), and the Creole ane from the French année ('year').

=== From West African languages ===
In a 2009 OffBeat article, the Ghanaian social linguist Evershed Amuzu said the chorus was "definitely West African", reflecting the tonal patterns of the region. He notes that the phrase ayeko—often doubled as ayeko, ayeko—is a popular chant meaning 'well done', or 'congratulations' among the Akan and Ewe people in modern-day Togo, Ghana, and Benin. Both groups were frequently taken in the slave trade, often through Haiti to Louisiana. Ewes in particular are credited with bringing West African cultural influences like Vodun rites to Haiti and on to New Orleans.

Musicologist Ned Sublette has backed the idea that the chorus might have roots in Haitian slave culture, considering that the rhythms of Mardi Gras Indians are nearly indistinguishable from the Haitian Kata rhythm. Yaquimo, he has also noted, was a common name among the Taíno inhabitants of Haiti in the early years of the slave trade. Jakamo Fi Na Ye is also, whether coincidentally or not, the phrase "The black cat is here" in Bambara, a West African Manding language.

In a 1991 lecture to the New Orleans Social Science History Association, Sybil Kein proposed the following translation from Yoruba and Creole:

enòn enòn
Aìku Aìku nde
Jacouman Fi na
ida – n – de
Jacouman Fi na dè

Translation:

Code language!
God is watching
Jacouman causes it; we will be emancipated
Jacouman urges it; we will wait.

=== Louisiana Voodoo ===
Louisiana Voodoo practitioners, as well as those familiar with West African religions, would recognize many aspects of the song as being about spirit possession. The practitioner, the horse, waves a flag representing a certain god to call that god into himself or herself. Setting a flag on fire is a curse. The man in green, who either changes personality or whose appearance is deceiving, would be recognized in Voodoo as possessed by a peaceful Rada spirit, inclining to green clothes and love magic. The man in red, who is being sent to kill, would likely be possessed by a vengeful Petwo spirit.

Haitian ethnologist Milo Rigaud published a transcription in 1953 of a Voodoo chant, "Crabigne Nago". This chant to invoke the Voodoo mystère Ogou Shalodeh is similar to "Iko, Iko" in both pentameter and phones.

Liki, liki ô! Liki, liki ô!
Ogou Shalodeh.
Papa Ogou Jacoumon,
Papa Ogou Shalodeh.
