= Chapel of Love (album) =

Studio album by the Dixie Cups
- Released: August 1964
- Genre: Pop; R&B
- Length: 27:45
- Label: Red Bird
- Producer: Jerry Leiber and Mike Stoller; Jeff Barry; Ellie Greenwich

The Dixie Cups chronology
Chapel of Love (1964)	Iko Iko (1965)

Singles from Chapel of Love
- 1. "Chapel of Love" Released: April 1964; 2. "People Say" Released: July 1964; 3. "Iko Iko" Released: March 1965; 4. "Gee the Moon Is Shining Bright" Released: June 1965

Professional ratings
Review scores
Source	Rating
Record Mirror	4/5 stars

Chapel of Love is the debut studio album by the New Orleans pop girl group the Dixie Cups. The album was produced by Jerry Leiber, Mike Stoller, Jeff Barry and Ellie Greenwich. It includes 11 tracks and was first released on Red Bird Records in August 1964. It was available in both mono and stereo, catalogue numbers RB 20-100 and RBS 20–100.

The album features the group's debut breakthrough hit, the number one smash on the Hot 100, "Chapel of Love". It also includes the hit singles "People Say" and "Iko Iko". Both "Chapel of Love" and "People Say" were written by Jeff Barry and Ellie Greenwich.

Other songs on the Chapel of Love album include the fourth and final single taken from the album, "Gee the Moon Is Shining Bright", originally recorded by Ronnie Spector under the title "Why Don't They Let Us Fall in Love". The Dixie Cups version is a slight rework of the lyrics. Although the group had scored three major hits, the album only charted at number 112 on the U.S. Billboard 200 Albums chart.

== Track listing ==
All tracks arranged by Mike Stoller; except where indicated

=== Side 1 ===
1. "Chapel of Love" (Jeff Barry, Ellie Greenwich, Phil Spector) arranged by Mike Stoller and Joe Jones – 2:51
2. "Gee the Moon Is Shining Bright" (Jeff Barry, Ellie Greenwich, Phil Spector) – 2:30
3. "I'm Gonna Get You Yet" (Earl King Johnson) arranged by Joe Jones and Wardell Quezergue – 2:30
4. "Ain't That Nice" (Earl King Johnson) arranged by Joe Jones and Wardell Quezergue – 2:20
5. "Thank You Mama, Thank You Papa" (Ernestine Gaines) arranged by Joe Jones and Wardell Quezergue – 2:41
6. "Another Boy Like Mine" (Jeff Barry, Ellie Greenwich) – 2:54

=== Side 2 ===
1. "Gee Baby Gee" (Jeff Barry, Ellie Greenwich) – 2:26
2. "Iko Iko" (Barbara Anne Hawkins, Rosa Lee Hawkins, Joan Marie Johnson) – 2:05
3. "Girls Can Tell" (Jeff Barry, Ellie Greenwich, Phil Spector) – 2:38
4. "All Grown Up" (Jeff Barry, Ellie Greenwich, Phil Spector) – 2:00
5. "People Say" (Jeff Barry, Ellie Greenwich) – 2:52

== Personnel ==
- Barbara Hawkins – lead and backing vocals
- Rosa Hawkins – lead and backing vocals
- Joan Johnson – lead and backing vocals

Technical

- Brooks Arthur - engineer
- Loring Eutemey - cover design
- Hugh Bell - cover photography

== Singles history ==
- "Chapel of Love" b/w "Ain't That Nice" (U.S. #1, UK #22 1964)
- "People Say" b/w "Girls Can Tell" (U.S. #12 1964)
- "Iko Iko" b/w "Gee Baby Gee" (U.S. #20, UK #23 1965)
- ”Gee the Moon Is Shining Bright" b/w "I'm Gonna Get You Yet" (U.S. #102 1965)

== Re-release ==
In 1965, Red Bird Records re-packaged the Chapel of Love album under the new title of Iko Iko with new cover art. The album is the same as their debut release and does not include any new tracks. Iko Iko was available only in mono, catalogue number RB 20–103. In 1997, the Iko Iko version of the album was issued on compact disc for the first time through the Marginal Records label.
