= People Say (song) =

Single by The Dixie Cups

from the album Chapel of Love
- B-side: "Girls Can Tell"
- Released: July 1964
- Genre: Pop, R&B
- Length: 2:20
- Label: Red Bird
- Songwriter(s): Jeff Barry, Ellie Greenwich
- Producer(s): Jerry Leiber, Mike Stoller, Ellie Greenwich and Jeff Barry

The Dixie Cups singles chronology
"Chapel of Love" (1964)	"People Say" (1964)	"You Should Have Seen the Way He Looked at Me" (1964)

"People Say" is a hit single written by the Jeff Barry and Ellie Greenwich songwriting team and made popular by the American pop girl group The Dixie Cups. It was originally released in July 1964 on the Red Bird Records label. The song was arranged by Mike Stoller. Billboard named the song #53 on their list of 100 Greatest Girl Group Songs of All Time.

== Background ==
Sung by Barbara Ann Hawkins, Rosa Lee Hawkins, and Joan Marie Johnson, it was the second hit collaboration between the Dixie Cups and the Barry-Greenwich team, with the first being their breakthrough hit "Chapel of Love". Produced by Jerry Leiber, Mike Stoller, Ellie Greenwich and Jeff Barry, the single was a hit peaking at number 12 on the Billboard Hot 100 Chart. It also charted at number 7 on the R&B Singles Chart. In Canada, "People Say" reached number 7 on the RPM Chart. It was the second single taken from the Dixie Cups' debut studio album Chapel of Love, issued on Red Bird Records in August 1964. The album peaked at number 112 on the Billboard 200 chart.

== Chart performance ==
Chart (1964)	Peak position
U.S. Billboard Hot 100	12
R&B Singles Chart	7
Canada RPM	7
