= Chapel of Love =

1964 single by the Dixie Cups

Single by The Dixie Cups

from the album Chapel of Love
- B-side: "Ain't That Nice"
- Released: April 1964
- Recorded: February 1964
- Genre: Pop
- Length: 2:45
- Label: Red Bird
- Songwriters: Jeff Barry, Ellie Greenwich and Phil Spector
- Producers: Jerry Leiber, Mike Stoller, Ellie Greenwich and Jeff Barry

The Dixie Cups singles chronology
"Chapel of Love" (1964)	"People Say" (1964)

"Chapel of Love" is a song written by Jeff Barry, Ellie Greenwich, and Phil Spector, and made famous by the Dixie Cups in 1964, spending three weeks at number one on the Billboard Hot 100. The song tells of the happiness and excitement the narrator feels on her wedding day, for her love and she are going to the "chapel of love", and "[they'll] never be lonely anymore." Many other artists have recorded the song.

It was originally recorded by Darlene Love in April 1963, but her version was not released until 1991. The Dixie Cups' version was the debut release of the new Red Bird Records run by Jerry Leiber and Mike Stoller along with George Goldner. The Ronettes included the song on their debut album released in November 1964 with production by Phil Spector. In 1973, singer and actress Bette Midler had a moderate hit with a cover of "Chapel of Love".

== The Dixie Cups version ==
=== Background ===
The song was written in 1963 by Jeff Barry and Ellie Greenwich, who had themselves recently married; Barry later said that "the concept of marriage was very much in my head" at the time. It was written for Darlene Love to record, but producer Phil Spector was dissatisfied with her version and it was not released for some years.

The Mel-Tones – a group of three young women from New Orleans, Barbara Ann Hawkins, Rosa Lee Hawkins, and Joan Marie Johnson – had traveled to New York City with their manager Joe Jones to attempt to get a record deal. They were given the song "Chapel of Love" to sing and passed an audition with Leiber and Stoller in the Brill Building. The group rehearsed the song with Barry and Greenwich before recording it. The arrangement was by Wardell Quezergue, and Leiber and Stoller added lyrics and some touches to the arrangements. Leiber and Stoller then decided to issue the record as the first release on their own new record label, Red Bird, and changed the group's name to the Dixie Cups.

The definitive version of "Chapel of Love" by the Dixie Cups was released as a single in April 1964. Sung by Barbara Ann Hawkins, Rosa Lee Hawkins, and Joan Marie Johnson, this version was the group's first single taken from their debut studio album Chapel of Love. The song was arranged by Joe Jones and produced by Jerry Leiber, Mike Stoller, Ellie Greenwich, and Jeff Barry. It charted at number one on June 6, 1964, on the Billboard Hot 100, knocking the Beatles out of the number-one spot and remained at the top for three weeks. The song also peaked at number 22 on the UK Singles Chart and hit number one in Canada on the RPM Chart. The "Chapel of Love" version by the Dixie Cups sold over one million copies and was awarded a gold disc. The song was later included on the soundtrack to films ranging from Full Metal Jacket to Father of the Bride. The hit single recorded by the Dixie Cups was ranked number 279 on Rolling Stone's list of The 500 Greatest Songs of All Time, being the group's only song on the list. Billboard named the song No. 33 on their list of 100 Greatest Girl Group Songs of All Time.

=== Charts ===
Chart (1964)	Peak position
Canada RPM	1
New Zealand Lever hit parade	1
UK Singles Chart	22
US Billboard Hot 100	1

== Bette Midler version ==
=== Background ===
American singer and actress Bette Midler recorded a cover version of "Chapel of Love" for her 1972 debut studio album, The Divine Miss M. The track was produced and arranged by Barry Manilow. The following year, Midler included her version as the B-side of her number-40 pop single, "Friends" (the single charted on the Billboard Hot 100 as a double A-side). The version included on the single release is a radically remixed version, with added horns and strings, and this version remained unreleased on any format other than the 45 rpm until it was included as a bonus track on the 2016 remastered edition of The Divine Miss M. Midler's single of "Chapel of Love" was issued on Atlantic Records.

=== Charts ===
Chart (1973)	Peak position
US Billboard Hot 100	40

== The Beach Boys version ==
"Chapel of Love"

Song by The Beach Boys

from the album 15 Big Ones
- Released: July 5, 1976
- Recorded: 1976
- Length: 2:34
- Songwriters: Jeff Barry, Ellie Greenwich and Phil Spector
- Producer: Brian Wilson

=== Background ===
A cover by the American rock group, the Beach Boys, was released on their 1976 album, 15 Big Ones.

=== Personnel ===
Personnel per 2026 liner notes:

The Beach Boys

- Al Jardine – backing vocals
- Mike Love – backing vocals
- Brian Wilson – lead vocals, backing vocals, ARP String Ensemble, grand piano, Minimoog bass
- Carl Wilson – phased electric guitar
- Dennis Wilson – drums

Additional musicians

- Mike Altschul – clarinet
- Steve Douglas – tenor saxophone
- Dennis Dreith – bass clarinet
- Gene Estes – tubular bells, hi-hat
- John J. Kelson Jr. – clarinet
- Carol Lee Miller – autoharp
- Jack Nimitz – bass clarinet

== Other versions ==
- The Blossoms were the first to record a version of the song in 1963, but it was never released as a single.
- The Ronettes covered the song as the last track for their Philles debut studio album, Presenting the Fabulous Ronettes Featuring Veronica, released in November 1964 and produced by Phil Spector.
- A loose Spanish-language version of the song, titled "Vete con Ella", was adapted and recorded by Mayté Gaos for her 1964 EP of the same name, in which she reworked the lyrics to focus on heartbreak and breakup. It was later performed by Mirla Castellanos on her album Imprevú (1966), and by Lucero in a synth-pop version on her album Ocho Quince (1988).
- The song was covered by Elton John for the soundtrack of Four Weddings and a Funeral in 1994.
