= Hep-Me Records =

- Founded: 1970
- Founder: Senator Jones
- Defunct: 1998
- Status: defunct
- Genre: Blues; R&B
- Country of origin: United States
- Location: New Orleans, Louisiana

Hep' Me Records or just simply Hep' Me was a New Orleans based blues and R&B record label established and run by Mississippi-born producer and record company owner Senator Jones based in New Orleans.

== Overview ==
Jones founded the label circa 1970 and named it after ex-Louisiana governor, John McKeithen's campaign catchphrase "Won’t you please hep me?" at the time he first ran for the post, and got him elected.

The first release on the label was in 1970 by New Orleans guitarist, David Douglas.

The artists on the label included Johnny Adams, Chris Kenner, Bobby Powell, Tommy Ridgley, Barbara George, and Walter "Wolfman" Washington.

The last known 45 single release by the label was in 1998 a single by Uncle Bo-Bo, a pseudonym for Senator Jones.

By 1990, Jones moved from New Orleans back to Mississippi. and died on November 5, 2008 in Bolton, Mississippi.

== Artists ==
- Charles Brimmer
- Gentlemen June Gardner
- Bobby Powell
- Tommy Ridgley
- Johnny Adams
- Barbara George
- Walter "Wolfman" Washington
- George Jackson

== See also ==
- List of record labels
