= Sinegal =

Sinegal is a surname. Notable people with the surname include:

- Bill Sinegal (1928–2014), American guitarist and songwriter
- James Sinegal (born 1936), American businessman
- Lil' Buck Sinegal (1944–2019), American guitarist and singer

== See also ==
- Senegal, a country in West Africa
