= Joe Jones (singer) =

American singer-songwriter (1926–2005)

- Born: Joseph Charles Jones; August 12, 1926; New Orleans, Louisiana, United States
- Died: November 27, 2005 (aged 79) Los Angeles, California
- Genres: R&B
- Occupations: Singer, songwriter, arranger
- Labels: Capitol, Roulette, Ric

Joseph Charles Jones (August 12, 1926 – November 27, 2005) was an American R&B singer, songwriter and arranger, who was born in New Orleans, Louisiana, United States. Jones is also generally credited with discovering the Dixie Cups. He also worked with B. B. King. As a singer, Jones had his biggest hit in the form of the Top Five 1960 R&B success, "You Talk Too Much", which also reached No. 3 on the Billboard Hot 100 chart.

== Career ==
Jones served in the U.S. Navy, where he played piano in a band, before studying music at the Juilliard Conservatory of Music. He formed a band, Joe Jones and his Atomic Rebops, in the late 1940s; band members played on Roy Brown's 1947 hit "Good Rocking Tonight". He was expelled from the New Orleans local chapter of the American Federation of Musicians for attempting to set up a rival organization but was later reinstated.

Jones became a valet, then pianist and arranger for B. B. King. He recorded his first solo single, "Adam Bit the Apple", for Capitol Records in 1954. He also discovered Shirley and Lee, and was their pianist, and whose recording of "Let the Good Times Roll" became a hit in 1956. In 1960, a re-recording of a song he had first recorded in 1958 for Roulette Records, "You Talk Too Much," became a national success, but his subsequent releases were less successful.

Jones claimed to have composed many songs, including the song "Iko Iko." Although his assertions were originally successful, a federal jury and then Court of Appeals ruled that Jones did not write "Iko Iko," that his claims were fraudulent, and that the true writers were the band he managed, the Dixie Cups (the true original recording of this song had been released as Checker 787 by New Orleans singer and pianist Sugar Boy Crawford and his Cane Cutters in late 1953). The band hired music attorney Oren Warshavsky, who had previously won a case demonstrating that Jones falsely professed ownership of another Mardi Gras classic song, "It Ain't My Fault." Jones also failed in his bid to declare title (though not as an author) to yet another Mardi Gras classic song, "Carnival Time." He also recorded the original "California Sun" on Roulette Records in 1961, which was made a hit by the Rivieras in 1963.

He later moved into music publishing, and worked tirelessly for the rights of fellow R&B acts. In 1973, Jones set up a company in Los Angeles, California, making advertising jingles.

== Death ==
Jones died in 2005 from complications from quadruple bypass surgery.

== Sexual misconduct allegations ==
In 2021, the Dixie Cups' Rosa Lee Hawkins revealed that she had been sexually abused by Jones, but has not let the painful memory sour her love of singing with The Dixie Cups. "We love what we do and that's coming from our heart. When we walk onstage to perform, we leave him behind. We leave his memory behind. The only time we talk about him is if somebody calls and says they want to do an interview. We know Joe is a so-and-so, but we have to realize it was him that, as they say, discovered us on that talent show, so that's all he deserves. He stole from us. We got one royalty check. I think it was $423 apiece."

== Discography ==
=== Singles ===
Year	Title	Peak chart positions		Record Label	B-side	Album
Year	Title	US Pop	US R&B	Record Label	B-side	Album
1954	"Will Call"	—	—	Capitol	"Adam Bit the Apple"	
1956	"You Done Me Wrong"	—	—	Herald	"When Your Hair Has Turned To Silver"	
1958	"A-Tisket A-Tasket"	—	—	Roulette	"Every Night About Eight"	
1958	"The Prisoner's Song"	—	—	Roulette	"To Prove My Love to You"	
1960	"You Talk Too Much"	3	9	Roulette	"I Love You Still"	You Talk Too Much
1960	"One Big Mouth (Two Big Ears)"	—	—	Roulette	"Here's What You Gotta Do"	You Talk Too Much
1961	"California Sun"	89	—	Roulette	"Please Don’t Talk About Me When I'm Gone"	
1961	"(I've Got A) Uh Uh Wife"	—	—	Roulette	"The Big Mule"	
