= The Dixie Cups =

American musical girl group of the 1960s

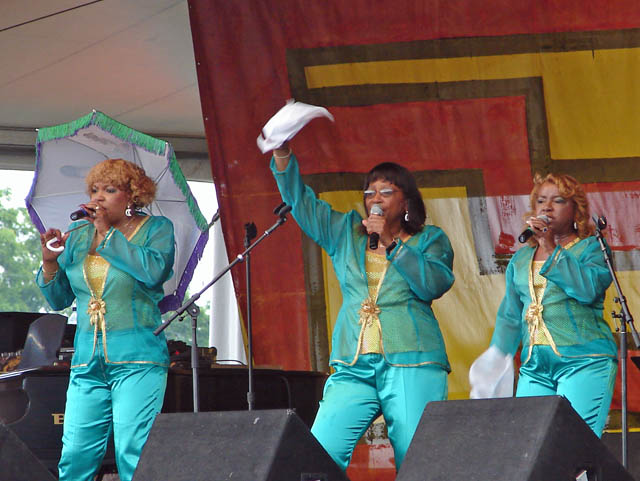
- The Dixie Cups at the New Orleans Jazz Fest in 2006. Left to right: Rosa Lee Hawkins, Athelgra Neville and Barbara Ann Hawkins.

Background information
- Also known as: The Meltones
- Origin: New Orleans, Louisiana, United States
- Genres: Rhythm and blues, pop
- Years active: 1963–present
- Labels: Red Bird; ABC-Paramount; ABC Records
- Members: Barbara Ann Hawkins; Athelgra Neville Gabriel
- Past members: Joan Marie Johnson; Beverly Brown; Rosa Lee Hawkins; Dale Mickle
- Website: The Dixie Cups' official site

The Dixie Cups (formerly known as The Meltones) are an American pop music girl group established in the 1960s. They are best known for a string of hits including their singles "Chapel of Love", "People Say", and "Iko Iko".

== Career ==
The trio consisted of sisters Barbara Ann and Rosa Lee Hawkins, plus their cousin Joan Marie Johnson, from New Orleans. They first sang together in grade school. Originally, they were to be called Little Miss and the Muffets, but were named the Dixie Cups just prior to their first release.

In 1963, the trio decided to pursue a professional career in music and began singing locally as the Meltones. Within a year Joe Jones, a successful singer in his own right with the Top Five 1960 single "You Talk Too Much", became their manager. After working with them for five months, Jones took them to New York City, where record producers/songwriters Jerry Leiber and Mike Stoller signed them to their new Red Bird Records label.

The Dixie Cups debut single was the release, "Chapel of Love," which became their biggest hit, reaching number one on the Billboard Hot 100 Chart in June 1964. "Chapel of Love" sold over one million copies and was awarded a gold disc. In 1987, the song "Chapel of Love" appeared on the Full Metal Jacket soundtrack and in the 1991 film Father of the Bride. The hit single by The Dixie Cups was ranked No. 279 on Rolling Stone's list of The 500 Greatest Songs of All Time. The group also had several other hits, including "People Say" (No. 12, 1964), "You Should Have Seen the Way He Looked at Me" (No. 39, 1964), "Little Bell" (No. 51, 1965), and "Iko Iko" (No. 20, 1965).

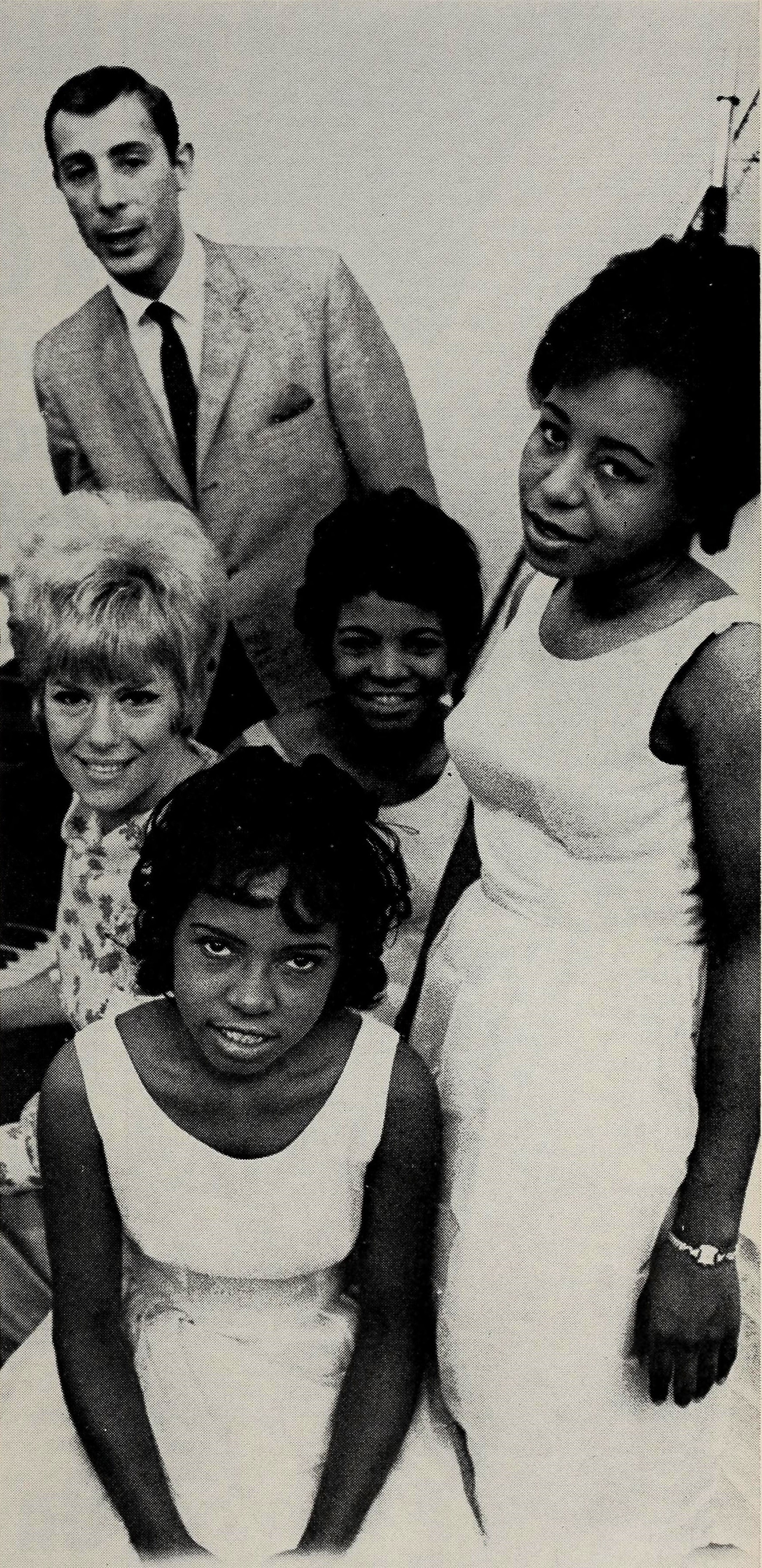
The Dixie Cups with Jeff Barry and Ellie Greenwich on the cover of Cash Box, August 29, 1964

"Iko Iko", a New Orleans traditional song, was recorded in 1964; however, it was released as a single early in 1965. Barbara Hawkins had heard her grandmother sing the song, first recorded in 1953 as "Jock-a-Mo" by James "Sugar Boy" Crawford. Barbara Hawkins stated that "We were just clowning around with it during a session using drumsticks on ashtrays. We didn't realize that Jerry and Mike had the tapes running". Leiber and Stoller overdubbed a bassline and percussion, and released it. It was The Dixie Cups' fifth and final hit.

In 1965, the Dixie Cups moved to the ABC-Paramount record label before a recording hiatus in 1966 temporarily halted their careers. In 1974, the Hawkins sisters moved from New York to New Orleans, where they both began successful modelling careers. Barbara Ann and Rosa Lee also worked as makeup artists. Joan Johnson retired from the group, unable to manage the stress of traveling. The Dixie Cups continued to tour as a trio with another New Orleans singer, Beverly Brown, replacing Joan Johnson who became a Jehovah's Witness and left her music career. Brown, who had recorded two solo discs in the early 1960s, stayed as the third member until the early 1980s when she became ill and was replaced by Dale Mickle. The Dixie Cups continue to perform and make personal appearances. The current lineup consists of the Hawkins sisters (until Rosa Lee's death in 2022) along with Athelgra Neville, sister of the singing Neville Brothers.

On August 29, 2005, Hurricane Katrina swept through Louisiana, flooding much of New Orleans and displacing Barbara and Rosa Hawkins, who subsequently relocated to Florida. Joan Johnson relocated to Texas. Two years later, in April 2007, the Louisiana Music Hall of Fame honored The Dixie Cups as inductees for their contributions to Louisiana music.

Joan Marie Johnson died in New Orleans of congestive heart failure on October 3, 2016, at the age of 72. Rosa Lee Hawkins died from surgical complications on January 11, 2022, at the age of 76.

== Discography ==
=== Singles ===
- "Chapel of Love" b/w "Ain't That Nice" (1964) Red Bird Records / U.S. Chart (Billboard) No. 1 UK No. 22 Canada RPM No. 1
- "People Say" b/w "Girls Can Tell" (1964) Red Bird Records/ U.S. Chart (Billboard) No. 12 R&B No. 7 Canada RPM No. 7
- "You Should Have Seen The Way He Looked at Me" b/w "No True Love" (1964) Red Bird Records/ U.S. Chart (Billboard) No. 39 Canada RPM No. 20
- "Little Bell" b/w "Another Boy Like Mine" (1964) Red Bird Records/ U.S. Chart (Billboard) No. 51 R&B No. 21
- "Iko Iko" b/w "I'm Gonna Get You Yet" (1965) Red Bird Records/ U.S. Chart (Billboard) No. 20 R&B No. 20 UK No. 23 Canada RPM No. 26
- "Iko Iko" b/w "Gee Baby Gee" (1965) Red Bird Records/ U.S. Chart (Billboard) No. 20
- "Gee The Moon Is Shining Bright" b/w "I'm Gonna Get You Yet" (1965) Red Bird Records/ U.S. Billboard No. 102
- "What Goes Up Must Come Down" b/w "I'm Not The Kind Of Girl (To Marry)" (1965) ABC-Paramount Records
- "A-B-C Song" b/w "That's What The Kids Said" (1965) ABC-Paramount Records
- "Love Ain't So Bad (After All)" b/w "Daddy Said No" (1966) ABC Records

=== Albums ===
- Chapel of Love (1964) Red Bird Records/ Billboard 200 No. 112
- Iko Iko (1965) Red Bird Records (re-packaged album that is the same as their debut with a different album cover under the title Iko Iko)
- Riding High (1965) ABC-Paramount Records
- Doing It Our Way (2011) Iri Records

=== Compilations ===
- Teen Anguish Volume One (1979) Charly Records
- The Best of the Dixie Cups (1985) Back-Trac Records
- The Dixie Cups Meet The Shangri-Las (1986) Charly Records
- The Very Best of the Dixie Cups: Chapel Of Love (1998) Collectables Records
- The Complete Red Bird Recordings (2002) Varèse Sarabande Records

== Original group members ==
- Barbara Ann Hawkins (born October 23, 1943)
- Joan Marie Johnson (January 15, 1944 – October 2, 2016)
- Rosa Lee Hawkins (October 23, 1945 – January 11, 2022)
