= Eddie Lang (singer) =

American singer and guitarist (1936–1985)

Eddie Lee Langlois (January 15, 1936 – March 10, 1985), known professionally as Eddie Lang, was an American R&B and soul singer and guitarist.

He was born in New Orleans, Louisiana, United States. By the early 1950s, he was second guitarist in Eddie "Guitar Slim" Jones' band. He made his own recordings, credited as 'Little Eddie, in the mid-1950s, for Bullet Records, and then recorded for the RPM label. In 1959, as Eddie Lang, he recorded "On My Own" and "Troubles Troubles", released by Ron Records. Under the pseudonym Sly Dell, he also recorded for the Seven B label.

In 1965, he made further recordings, releasing "The Love I Have For You" and "The Sad One" on the Seven B label owned by Joe Banashak. His Seven B recordings have been described as his finest recordings, "outstanding", "very forceful" and "superbly judged". He later recorded for the Superdome label, with "Food Stamp Blues" becoming one of his most successful recordings.

Following a stroke in the late 1970s, he died in 1985 at his home in Slidell, Louisiana.
