= Al "Carnival Time" Johnson =

American singer and piano player (born 1939)

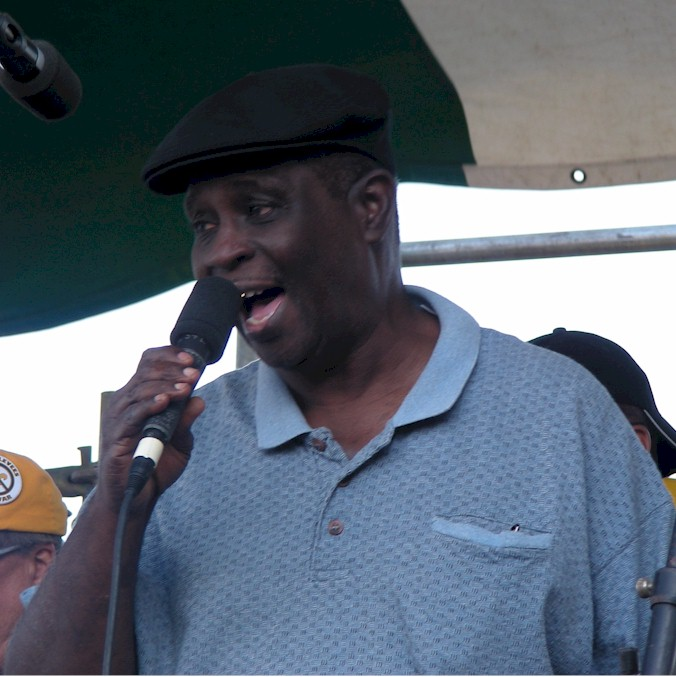
- Johnson performing in New Orleans, 2007

Background information
- Born: Alvin Lee Johnson; June 20, 1939 (age 87)
- Origin: New Orleans, Louisiana, United States
- Genres: Rhythm and blues
- Occupation: Singer
- Instruments: Vocals, piano
- Years active: 1954–present
- Labels: Aladdin, Ric

Al "Carnival Time" Johnson (born June 20, 1939, in New Orleans, Louisiana) is an American singer and piano player best known for the Mardi Gras song "Carnival Time".

== History ==
=== Early life and career ===
After spending his early years in Houston, Johnson returned to New Orleans at the age of ten settling in the Lower Ninth Ward. His father bought him a trumpet, also a piano for his sisters and a trombone for his brother. Johnson took interest in the piano and learned the basic chord changes in different keys. His early musical influences included Sugar Boy Crawford, Fats Domino and Smiley Lewis.

In 1956, at seventeen, he recorded his first songs, "Ole Time Talkin" and "I've Done Wrong"" for Aladdin Records. Johnson subsequently signed with Ric records and recorded series of songs at Cosimo Matassa's New Orleans recording studio starting with "Lena" in 1958. "Carnival Time" was recorded for the label in 1960. Produced by Joe Ruffino, the owner of Ric Records, the song eventually joined Professor Longhair’s "Go to the Mardi Gras" and "Big Chief", and The Hawketts "Mardi Gras Mambo" as one of the most played and requested classics of the New Orleans Mardi Gras. Johnson was drafted and subsequently served and stationed at Fort Bliss, Texas.

When he returned to New Orleans in late 1964 he found that Ruffino had died and a protracted legal fight over royalties and rights to his music, among others, had left him with virtually nothing to show for his songs. Somewhere along the line, Johnson was nicknamed "Carnival Time" in honor of his famous song.

=== 1990s ===
Johnson continued to perform where he could, and was finally awarded full rights to his hit song in 1999.

=== 21st century ===
In 2005, he reigned as King of the New Orleans Krewe Du Vieux. In 2006, in a limited release, he brought forward "Mardi Gras Strut", a new Mardi Gras celebration song.

In 2007, in performance in Mandeville, Louisiana, Johnson was inducted into The Louisiana Music Hall of Fame. Also in that year, he released the critically acclaimed "Lower Ninth Ward Blues", reflecting the plight of his and many others dislocation from their homes in the New Orleans Lower Ninth Ward by Hurricane Katrina.

In January 2008, he performed as a guest artist at the Inaugural Ball of Louisiana Governor Bobby Jindal, sharing the stage with Deacon John Moore and his band, "The Ivories".

Johnson recently took possession of his new home in the Harry Connick Jr. "Musicians' Village" development in New Orleans for Hurricane Katrina refugee musicians.

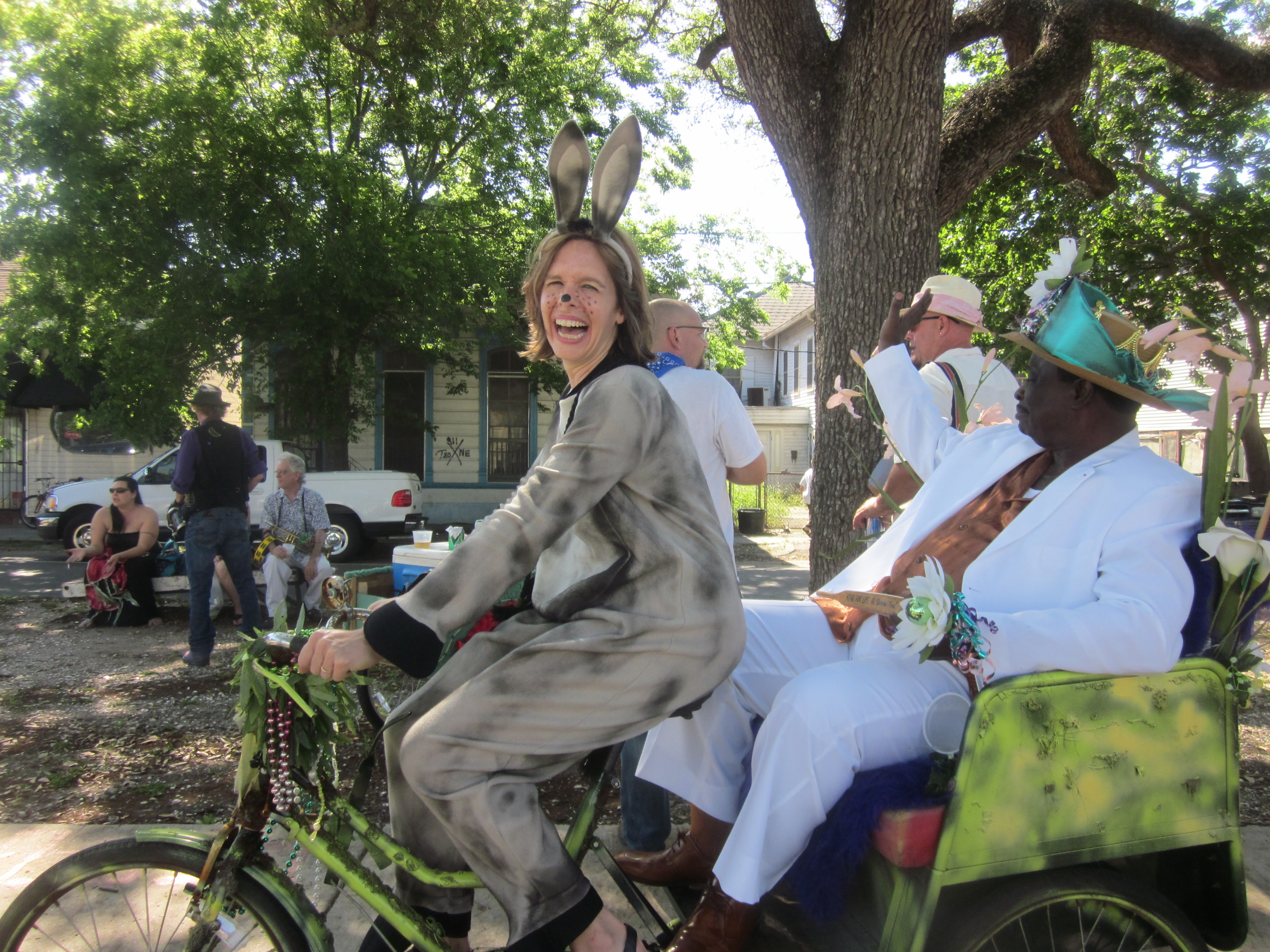
King Al rides in the Goodchildren Easter Parade

In 2012 Johnson was proclaimed honorary "King for Life" of New Orleans' Goodchildren Social Aid & Pleasure Club.

== Discography ==
- It's Carnival Time All The Time (2006)
- Lower Ninth Ward Blues (2007)
- Beyond Carnival (2013)
