= Kili Watch =

1960 single by the Cousins

- 7" vinyl Belgian vinyl single cover

Single by the Cousins

from the album Join The Cousins
- Language: (American) Indian
- B-side: "Fuego"
- Released: 6 October 1960
- Recorded: 15 September 1960
- Genre: Rock and Roll
- Length: 2:36
- Label: Palette
- Songwriter: Gus Derse

The Cousins singles chronology
| "Kili Watch" (1960) | "Dang Dang" (1961) |

Music video
- "Kili Watch" (French TV, 1961) on YouTube

"Kili Watch" is a song originally recorded by the Belgian band The Cousins. They released it in October 1960 (as a single and on an EP). A French-language version by French singer Johnny Hallyday would follow one month later, having the same Chart success as the Cousins' original, charing simultaneously with the original.

== Background ==
"Kili Watch" was written by Gus Derse in 1960. Briefly the bassist of the group, having, shortly after its recording, on September 15, 1960, in the Philips studios, submitted the title alone to Sabam, while everyone collaborated on its creation. In conflict with the three other members, even before the release of the record, he left the Cousins. "Kili Watch" was broadcast for the first time on Belgian airwaves on 13 October 1960. On 30 October, it was broadcast on Radio Luxembourg, while the French public discovered it on 15 November on the French variety radio programme "Salut les copains" ("Hi buddies"), which ran from 1959 to 1969 on Europe 1. In November in the Belgian monthly magazine Juke Box, the song was ranked 15th on the French-speaking side and 18th on the Flemish side. The song was later featured as the opening track on their debut album "Join The Cousins" in 1961.

== Charts ==
| Chart (1960–1961) | Peak position |
|---|---|
| Belgium (Ultratop 50 Flanders) | 3 |
| Belgium (Ultratop 50 Wallonia) | 1 |
| Netherlands (Single Top 100) | 6 |

== Johnny Hallyday version (in French) ==
"Kili Watch"

Single by Johnny Hallyday

from the album Nous les gars, nous les filles
- Language: French
- B-side: "Ce Serait Bien"
- Released: 24 November 1960
- Recorded: November 1960
- Genre: Rock and Roll
- Length: 2:45
- Label: Disques Vogue
- Songwriters: French adaptation: Jil & Jan

Johnny Hallyday singles chronology
| "Le p'tit clown de ton cœur" (1960) | "Kili Watch" (1960) | "Tu parles trop" (1961) |

Music video
- "Kili watch" (French Swiss TV, 1961) on YouTube

In the same year, the song was adapted into French by lyricists Jil & Jan and recorded by Johnny Hallyday, one month after the Cousins' original and shortly after the song was introduced to the French public. His version spent one week at no. 1 on the singles sales chart in France (from 9 to 15 January 1961). Hallyday's version would later be featured on his second studio album "Nous les gars, nous les filles" (Us guys, us girls) in 1961.

=== Charts ===
| Chart (1960–1961) | Peak position |
|---|---|
| Belgium (Ultratop 50 Wallonia) | 1 |
| France (singles sales) | 1 |
