= Why Don't They Let Us Fall in Love =

Single by Veronica
- B-side: "Chubby Danny D"
- Released: July 1964
- Recorded: March 1963
- Studio: Gold Star, Hollywood
- Length: 2:22
- Label: Phil Spector
- Songwriters: Phil Spector; Ellie Greenwich; Jeff Barry
- Producer: Phil Spector

Veronica singles chronology
"So Young" (1964)	"Why Don't They Let Us Fall in Love" (1964)	"Try Some, Buy Some" (1971)

"Why Don't They Let Us Fall in Love" is a song written by Phil Spector, Ellie Greenwich, and Jeff Barry. It was first recorded by American singer Ronnie Spector, who was credited as Veronica. In 1964, it was released as an A-sided single backed with "Chubby Danny D". It did not chart.

The song was originally intended for the Ronettes, and was recorded at Gold Star Studios in March 1963, but Spector withheld its release for the reason that he did not feel it to be a number-one record. Instead, "Be My Baby" was issued. "Why Don't They Let Us Fall in Love" was not placed on an LP until Phil Spector Wall of Sound Vol. 6 – Rare Masters Vol. 1, a rarities compilation issued in the UK in 1976.

In 1965, the New Orleans pop girl group the Dixie Cups released the single "Gee the Moon Is Shining Bright", an alternate version of the song with slightly reworked lyrics. Their version bubbled under the Hot 100 at number 102. It was the fourth and final single taken from their debut studio album Chapel of Love. Cash Box described it as "a pulsating, rhythmic pop-blues romancer about a very-much-in-love gal who can’t wait to have some time alone with her fella."

== Other versions ==
- 1965 – Sonny & Cher, Look At Us
- 2008 – The Morning Benders
- 2013 – The Beach Boys, Made in California (recorded July 1980)

== Sources ==
- Brown, Mick (2012). Tearing Down The Wall of Sound: The Rise And Fall of Phil Spector. A&C Black. ISBN 978-1-4088-1950-0.
- Cateforis, Theo, ed. (2013). The Rock History Reader. Routledge. ISBN 978-0-415-89212-4.
- Clemente, John (2000). Girl Groups—Fabulous Females That Rocked The World. Krause Publications. ISBN 0-87341-816-6.
- Thompson, Dave (2010). Phil Spector: Wall Of Pain. Omnibus Press. ISBN 978-0-85712-216-2.
- Williams, Richard (2003). Phil Spector: Out of His Head. Music Sales Group. ISBN 978-0-7119-9864-3.
- Whitburn, Joel (2009). Top Pop Singles 1955-2008 (12th ed.). Record Research Inc. ISBN 978-0-89820-180-2.
