= Ridgeley =

Ridgeley may refer to:

== Places ==
- Ridgeley, Nebraska, U.S.
- Ridgeley, West Virginia, U.S
- Ridgeley Township, Dodge County, Nebraska, U.S.

== People ==
- Andrew Ridgeley (born 1963), English musician
- The Ridgely family, a prominent political and military family in Maryland and Delaware

== Other uses ==
- Ridgeley Sandstone, a sandstone in the Appalachian Mountains, U.S.
- Ridgeley School, a historic school building in Capitol Heights, Maryland, U.S.
- Ridgeley High School, in Mineral County, West Virginia, U.S., 1934-1976

== See also ==
- Ridgley (disambiguation)
- Ridgely (disambiguation)
