= Charles Brimmer =

American musician

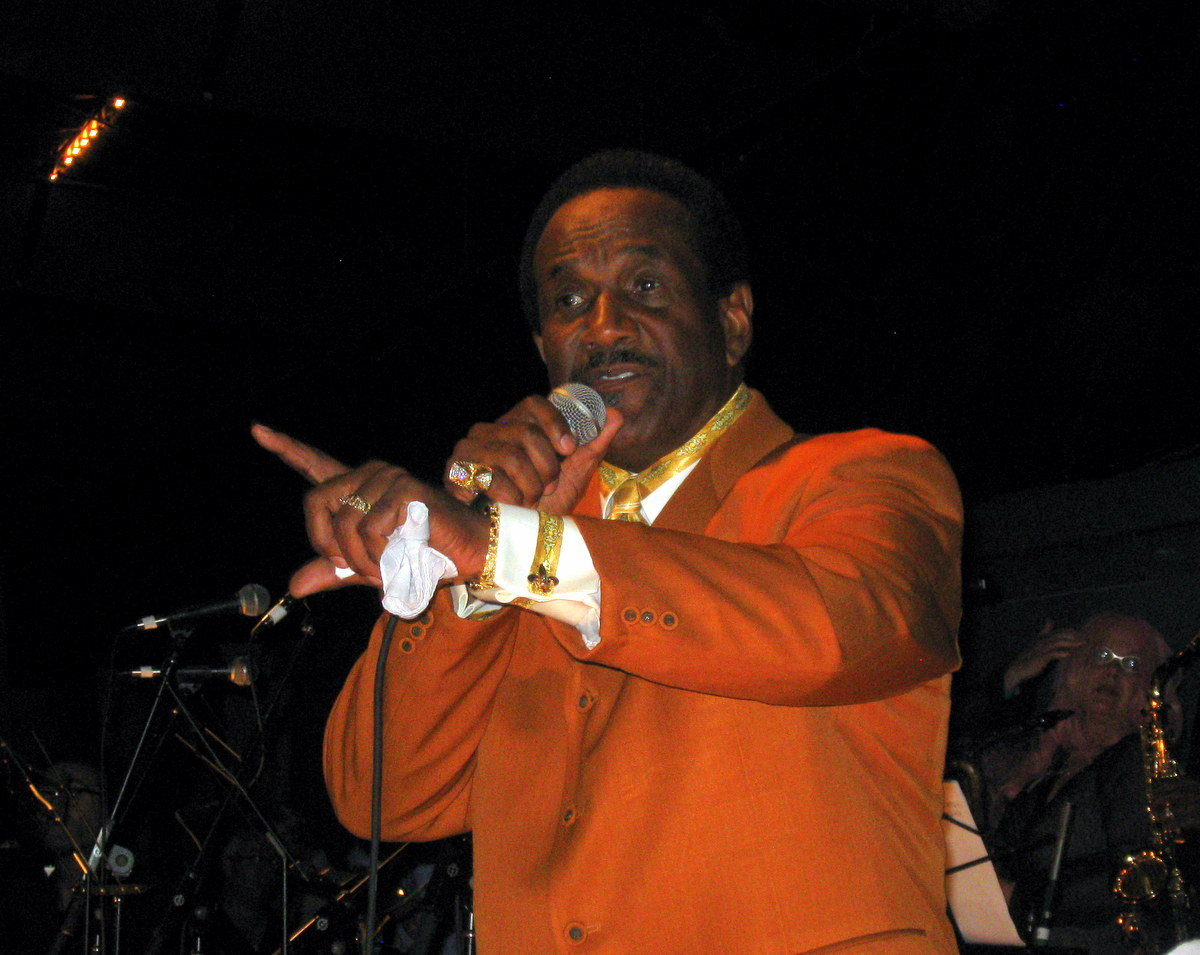

Background information
- Born: Charles Noel Brimmer; October 10, 1948 (age 77); New Orleans, Louisiana
- Genres: Rhythm and blues, Soul, Funk
- Occupations: Singer, composer
- Years active: c.1960s – present
- Labels: Geneva, ABS, Broadmoor, Hep' Me, Brimco, Chelsea, JB's, King Kokomo, Special Agent, Hayley, Charly

Charles Brimmer (born October 10, 1948) is an American Rhythm & Blues singer and composer working principally in New Orleans since the 1960s.

== Early years ==
Charles Noel Brimmer was born to Ivory Brimmer, Sr, and Bell Lena Brown in New Orleans, Louisiana, one of three sons and a daughter. He grew up in the city's Ninth Ward, and by the age of eight years old was singing in gospel choirs. As a sophomore at St. Augustine High School he began performing with local R&B band the Ravens, replacing Carl Weathers. His first recording opportunity was as a teenager with brother Ivory, Jr. for New York company Geneva Records. They recorded "My Little Baby" b/w "My Soul’s On Fire" as Charles and Ivory.

== Career ==
At age 16 Charles Brimmer was contracted to Camille Incardona's ABS (Always Better Sounds) Records, distributed by Cosimo Matassa's Dover Records. He worked with producer Wardell Quezergue on several recordings. "Wardell Quezergue was the arranger," said Brimmer. "He took me to Nola Records, which was his production company. He asked me to pick some songs to record." Brimmer had a minor local hit with "The Glide." He soon began to perform with David Battiste and the Gladiators around New Orleans. He earned enough to finance his studies at Southern University at New Orleans, graduating with a degree in accounting. "Music paid my way through college," Brimmer recalled. "During the breaks I’d be in the corner studying while the band partied."

Brimmer was signed by producer Dave Bartholomew in 1969 to his Broadmoor Records label, which released "Black Is Beautiful" and "The Feeling Is In My Heart." The latter disc was a regional success, causing Brimmer's career to begin to take off. Brimmer decided to suspend his recording career after ABS Records and Broadmoor Records refused to record the album they had pledged when his singles sold the agreed upon amounts.

In the early 1970s Brimmer was performing around New Orleans with his own band "The Oneway Express" revue. "Senator (Jones) used to come around and watch me sing," said Brimmer. "He wanted me to cover an O.V. Wright tune—'Afflicted.' We cut it, but the side everybody went wild over was 'Your So Called Friends.'" The success of the single on Jones' Hep' Me Records caught the attention of the executives at Memphis' Hi Records. Hi wanted to lease the single, and record an album on Charles Brimmer. He was still under contract to ABS and Broadmoor, and those two companies wanted to produce the album for Hi. Hi was not interested in that arrangement and passed on the record. Brimmer then successfully got out of all contracts with the companies for which he had recorded.

Senator Jones came back around in 1974 to record Brimmer covering Al Green's "God Blessed Our Love" as "The New God Blessed Our Love". The record took off on regional radio stations and Jones got orders for 10,000 copies. He leased the recording to Chelsea Records in Los Angeles. The single racked up 300,000 copies, reaching #43 on the R&B charts in 1975, and the ensuing album "Expression of Soul" sold 10,000. Brimmer did package shows and toured venues in the south and east coast for nine months behind the records. Chelsea followed up with singles and a second album "Soulman" that were not as well-received."

Brimmer thought Senator Jones was only doing the minimum to produce and promote his music. He also discovered the senator jones was using his royalties to bankroll studio time for other New Orleans artists. In 1976 he left the music scene in New Orleans and moved to Los Angeles in an effort to jump start his career. He had little success in getting gigs at clubs and found record companies uninterested in recording the type of soul music he sang. He worked a day job as an accountant Brimmer later said he felt like "a small fish in a big pond." He returned briefly to New Orleans in 1983 to wax a cover of Marvin Gaye's "Distant Lover" on King Kokomo Records, his brother Ivory's label. The record failed to receive much attention.

In 1986 Brimmer moved back to New Orleans. He recorded "It's Mardi Gras Time" b/w " Don't Want To Jam On The Groove" on his Brimco Records Label. He made several more recordings through the 1980s, and retired from music except for occasional special appearances. He performed at the Ponderosa Stomp Festival in New Orleans on October 4, 2013.

== Personal life ==
After his departure from the music business Brimmer devoted his time to his business career and raising a family. He worked as a financial comptroller for a health insurance company, and headed an industrial cleaning concern. He is married to Andrea Domino, daughter of Fats Domino, and they have 2 children.

== Discography ==
SINGLES

- My Little Baby / My Soul's On Fire (CHARLES & IVORY) GENEVA 106
- I Need You I Do / The Glide ABS 110
- Black Is Beautiful / Man Has Landed On The Moon - Broadmoor - USA - A-132-BY
- Mr. Teardrops / The Feeling Is In My Heart BROADMOOR 201
- What's That You Got / Memphis Woman BROADMOOR 202
- God Blessed Our Love / God Blessed Our Love Pt2 CHELSEA 3017
- I Stand Accused CHELSEA 3030
- Love Her Like a Lover CHELSEA 3032
- Please Let Me Come Home / Just Another Morning CHELSEA 3039
- Love Me In Your Own Way / I Wanna Be Your Bread Winner CHELSEA 3049
- Don't Change Horses / Afflicted HEP ME 117
- Your So Called Friends / Afflicted HEP ME 2
- Kung Fu Man / Kung Fu Man Pt2 JB's 2603
- The New God Blessed Our Love / The New God Blessed Our Love Pt2 JB's 2607
- Distant Lover / Inst KING KOKOMO 101
- It's Mardi Gras Time / Don't Want To Jam On The Groove BRIMCO
- God Blessed Our Love / I Stand Accused SPECIAL AGENT 9005 (UK 45)
- Don't Look Back / I'm Gonna Forget About You BRIMCO 101
- Freedom Overspill / Inst BRIMCO 200
- Show And Tell HAYLEY HR1004

ALBUMS

- Soul Man CHELSEA 520
- Expressions Of Soul CHELSEA 508 1975
- Brimful of Soul CHARLY R&B CRB 1123
