= Rockie Charles =

- Born: Alfred Charles Merrick; November 14, 1942; Boothville, Louisiana, U.S.
- Died: March 12, 2010 (aged 67) New Orleans, Louisiana, U.S.
- Genres: Blues, soul
- Occupations: Musician, bandleader
- Instrument: Guitar
- Years active: 1958 – 2010
- Labels: Black Patch, Soulgate, Orleans Records

Alfred Charles Merrick (November 14, 1942 – March 21, 2010), known professionally as Rockie Charles was an American blues and soul singer, songwriter and guitarist from New Orleans. He was described as the "President of Soul".

== Early years ==
Charles was born in Boothville, Louisiana and learned to play guitar from his father, Earlington, a travelling bluesman who played juke joints in the segregated Plaquemines Parish, Louisiana. Charles moved to New Orleans aged 13, where he shared the stage with fellow teenagers Ernie K-Doe and Aaron Neville at talent contests which were frequently held at Lincoln Beach, the African-American amusement park near Lake Pontchartrain during segregation. His early influences were Earl King and Chuck Berry. Charles dropped out of high school in the 10th grade and moved to Venice, Louisiana. He returned to New Orleans aged 18 and started the band The Gadges.

== Career ==
According to the New Orleans Time Picyaune, Charles was turned down by Dave Bartholomew at Imperial Records and Allen Toussaint at Instant and Minit. He instead signed with Senator Jones' Black Patch label in the mid-1960s and released the singles "Mr. Rickashay" and "Sinking Like A Ship." After releasing records with Black Patch, Charles relocated to Nashville, where he backed performers including O.V. Wright, Little Johnny Taylor, and Roscoe Shelton. He returned to New Orleans in 1970, and set up his own label, Soulgate, on which he had a local hit with "The President of Soul Part I". During the 1970s and 1980s he worked as a tugboat captain and oyster fisherman, while playing in various jazz and blues clubs.

His recording career resumed in 1994 after New Orleans Records producer Carlo Ditta responded to an advertisement Charles had placed in a local entertainment magazine. This led to the release of his debut solo LP, Born for You in 1996. He subsequently recorded two albums with Louie Fontaine in 2003 and 2006.

== Death ==
Charles died of cancer at the age of 67, shortly after completing an album, I Want First Class. Ponderosa Stomp organiser Ira "Dr. Ike" Padnos said that "If Rockie had had the right push, the right breaks, he really could have done something great ... he was a first-class, stand-up guy. I loved him for that."

== Discography ==
=== Albums ===
- Born for You (Orleans, 1997)
- The War Is Over (Soulgates, 2001)
- Have You Seen My Uncle Steve (Soulgates, 2002)
- It's Party Time for the Mardi Gras (Rockie Charles, 2003)
- I Want First Class (Soulgates, 2007)

=== Singles ===
- "Sinking Like A Ship" / "Riccasha" (Black Patch 711, 1967)
- "The President of Soul Part I" / "The President of Soul Part II" (Soulgates 8716/7, 1971)
- "Someday I'll Fall in Love" / "Living in the Good Times" (Soulgates 72–6050366, 1974)
- "Calling Your Name" / "Show My People Around the Curve" (Soulgates 72–6050366, 1975)
