= Bill Sinegal =

American songwriter

Willie Norman Sinegal (or Bill Sinigal; May 13, 1928 – April 14, 2014, New Orleans, Louisiana) was an American rhythm and blues bass guitarist and songwriter from New Orleans. He is best known for his song Second Line.

Sinegal played tenor saxophone and C melody saxophone. He studied double bass at the Grunewald School of Music. He served in the United States Army during World War II. After the war, he worked in backup bands in New Orleans for musicians including Guitar Slim, Tommy Ridgley and Sugar Boy Crawford. In 1959, he began playing with Earl King. He toured extensively in the 1960s with Curtis Mayfield and Dee Clark.

In 1964 he released a R&B single with Bill Sinigal and the Skyliners called Second Line, Parts 1 & 2 which featured rhythms from a traditional Second line (parades) brass band song, Joe Avery's Blues. The song was recorded in the studio of Cosimo Matassa with Milton Batiste on trumpet, James Rivers on tenor saxophone, and Ellis Marsalis on piano. Second Line became a Mardi Gras standard.

In the late 1960s, he left the music business to work as a photographer.
