= Ridgely =

Ridgely may refer to:

== Places ==
- Ridgely, Maryland, U.S
  - Ridgely Airpark
- Ridgely, Missouri, U.S
- Ridgely, Tennessee, U.S
- Ridgely Township, Nicollet County, Minnesota, U.S.
- Fort Ridgely, a frontier U.S. Army outpost 1851–1867 in Minnesota Territory
  - Battle of Fort Ridgely

== People ==
=== Given name ===
- Ridgely Gaither (1903–1992), United States Army general
- Ridgely Hunt (1887–1933), American publishing executive and professor
- Ridgely Johnson (born 1958), American rower
- Ridgely Torrence (1874–1950), American poet and editor

=== Surname ===
- Ridgely family of Maryland and Delaware
- Cleo Ridgely (1893–1962), film star
- Charles Ridgely (disambiguation), the name of several people
- Edwin R. Ridgely (1844–1927), U.S. Representative from Kansas
- Eliza Ridgely (1803–1867), American heiress
- Henry M. Ridgely (1779–1847), American lawyer and U.S. Representative and U.S. Senator from Delaware
- Henry du Pont Ridgely (born c. 1949), American judge
- John Ridgely (1909–1968), American film character actor
- Mabel Lloyd Ridgely (1872–1962), American suffragist and historical preservationist
- Priscilla Dorsey Ridgely (1762–1814), a First Lady of Maryland
- Reginald H. Ridgely Jr. (1902–1979), American Marine general
- Richard Ridgely (1869–1949), American actor and film director
- Robert Ridgely (1931–1997), American actor and voice artist
- Robert S. Ridgely (born 1946), American ornithologist
- William Barret Ridgely (1858–1920), a U.S. Comptroller of the Currency

== See also ==
- Ridgeley (disambiguation)
- Ridgley (disambiguation)
