= Carnival Time (song) =

1960 song performed by Al "Carnival Time" Johnson

Single by Al "Carnival Time" Johnson
- A-side: "Carnival Time"
- B-side: "Good Lookin'"
- Released: 1960
- Recorded: 1960
- Genre: R&B
- Length: 2:41
- Label: Ric
- Songwriters: Al Johnson and Joe Ruffino
- Producer: Joe Ruffino

"Carnival Time" is a New Orleans Mardi Gras-themed R&B song that was performed by Al Johnson and recorded in 1960. The song's composition was originally credited to Al Johnson and Joe Ruffino, though Johnson now holds exclusive rights. It is now considered an iconic festive song of the New Orleans Carnival season.

== Background ==
Al Johnson, sometimes referred to as Al "Carnival Time" Johnson, was the singer and pianist who performed "It's Carnival Time". He was originally from New Orleans, Louisiana. After spending his early years in Houston, he returned to New Orleans at the age of ten settling in the Lower Ninth Ward. His father bought a piano for his sisters and a trombone for his brother which Johnson took interest, and learning the basic chord changes in different keys. His early musical influences included Sugar Boy Crawford, Fats Domino and Smiley Lewis, to name a few.

In 1956, at seventeen, he recorded his first songs, "Ole Time Talkin" and "I've Done Wrong"" for Aladdin Records. Johnson subsequently signed with Ric records and recorded series of songs at Cosimo Matassa's New Orleans recording studio starting with "Lena" in 1958. In 1960 Johnson recorded "Carnival Time" for the label. The song was produced by Joe Ruffino, owner of the Ric label. Its composition was originally credited to both Johnson and Ruffino.

Johnson was subsequently drafted into the army and was stationed at Fort Bliss, Texas. When he returned to New Orleans in late 1964, he found that Ruffino had died and that a protracted legal fight over royalties and rights to his music, among others, had left him with virtually nothing to show for his songs. Johnson continued to perform where he could, and was finally awarded full rights to his hit song in 1999.

The song has become a local classic and has joined Professor Longhair's "Go to the Mardi Gras" and "Big Chief", and The Hawketts "Mardi Gras Mambo" as one of the most played and requested songs of the New Orleans Mardi Gras.

== Discography ==
- "Carnival Time" b/w "Good Lookin'" (Ric 967-3459, 1960)
