= You Talk Too Much (Joe Jones song) =

1960 single by Joe Jones

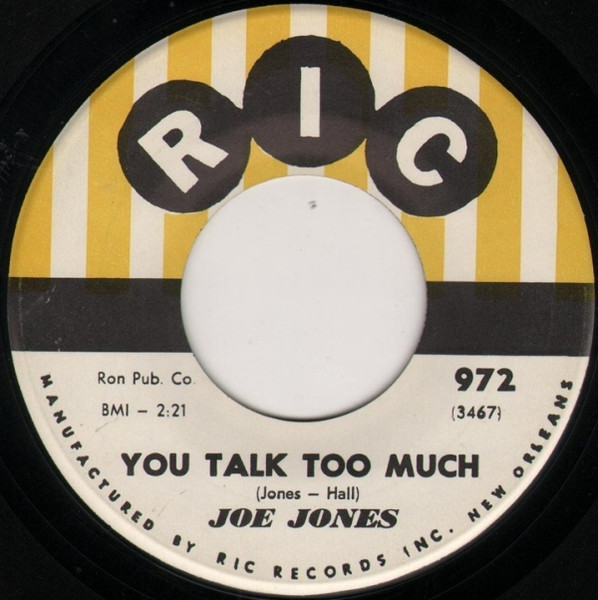

Single by Joe Jones

from the album You Talk Too Much
- B-side: "I Love You Still"
- Released: July 1960
- Genre: R&B
- Length: 2:41
- Label: Ric
- Songwriters: Reginald Hall, Joe Jones
- Producer: Sylvia Robinson (uncredited)

Joe Jones singles chronology
"The Prisoner's Song" (1958)	"You Talk Too Much" (1960)	"One Big Mouth (Two Big Ears)" (1960)

"You Talk Too Much" is a 1960 single by American R&B singer Joe Jones, co-written by Jones and Reginald Hall. The song reached Number 3 on the Billboard Hot 100. Released by Ric Records, it would be the label's only commercial success. Later that year, the song was adapted into French by Georges Aber as "Tu parles trop" and was a hit for Johnny Hallyday in early 1961.

== Background ==
It was written by Fats Domino's brother-in-law, Reginald Hall. Domino passed the song on to Jones who performed it during his club act. Jones recorded the song for the New Orleans–based Ric Records in New York City in 1960. It was produced by Sylvia Vanderpool Robinson who was half of the duo Mickey & Sylvia, but she was not credited for the session. The lyrics describe a significant other of the lyricist, who talks excessively about things and people the former never sees or hears.

Initially released by Ric in July 1960, the record caused legal issues with the New York City–based Roulette Records because Jones had previously recorded a version of the tune under contract with Roulette. In October 1960, the labels reached an amicable settlement in which Roulette bought the master recording from Ric. The disk switched labels on the Billboard charts where it peaked at No. 3 on the Hot 100 and No. 9 on the Hot R&B Sides.

== Chart performance ==
=== Weekly charts ===
Chart (1960)	Peak Position
Billboard Hot 100	3
Billboard Hot R&B Sides	9
Billboard Honor Roll of Hits	5

=== Year-end charts ===
Chart (1960)	Rank
Billboard Hot 100 singles	89

== Johnny Hallyday version (in French) ==
"Tu parles trop"

Single by Johnny Hallyday

from the album Nous les gars, nous les filles
- Language: French
- B-side: "Bien trop timide"
- Released: January 6, 1961
- Genre: Rock and roll
- Length: 2:00
- Label: Disques Vogue

Johnny Hallyday singles chronology
"Kili watch" (1960)	"Tu parles trop" (1961)	"Nous les gars, nous les filles" (1961)

In late 1960, the song was adapted into French by Georges Aber as "Tu parles trop" (a literal translation of the title) and was recorded by Johnny Hallyday, and was released as a single in January 1961 from his second studio album Nous les gars, nous les filles ("Us guys, us girls"), which was released one month later. Hallyday's version reached Number 6 on the French Belgian charts in early 1961.

=== Charts ===
Chart (1961)	Peak position
Belgium (Ultratop 50 Wallonia)	6
