= Sammy Ridgley =

American singer

- Born: Samuel Ridgley; August 6, 1943; New Orleans, Louisiana, United States
- Died: August 27, 2016 (aged 73) New Orleans
- Genres: Blues; R&B
- Occupations: Musician, singer
- Instrument: Vocals

Samuel Ridgley (born August 6, 1943 – August 27, 2016) was an American R&B artist associated with New Orleans. His recorded output was slight just two singles and an album but he was a regular on the New Orleans' music circuit for over 30 years. He was also a committed civil rights activist who represented his community of Jefferson Parish in New Orleans.

== Career ==
Ridgley was raised in the Shrewsbury section of Jefferson Parish on Andover Street. He started singing gospel at the First Zion Baptist Church. Ridgley's biggest early influence was Joe Tex.

In 1962, Ridgley joined a seven-piece band and the band got $100 a night while working during a day job at a funeral home.

In 1965, Ridgley recorded a session at Cosimo's called "The Hully Gully" with Tommy Ridgley, Eddie Bo, and Irma Thomas singing background, but the session was never released. Ridgley also recalled working with O.W. Scott & the Magnificent with whom he made some recordings at WYLD's studio that were not released."

Around 1968, Ridgley started his own band called Operation Plus, which played at "the Young Man's Night Club on the Causeway for 24 years". In 1972, Ridgley signed with local producer/promoter Elijah Walker. Walker produced Ridgley's first single, "I've Heard That Story" and "Shake A Shake Sue". The record was arranged by Wardell Quezergue and released on the King's Row label. However, when Walker died unexpectedly in 1973, Ridgley's career slowed and he cut just one further single.

In 1981, Tommy Ridgley invited Ridgley to open his show with Rose Davis.

In 1998, Ridgley was working at the Treasure Chest Casino when he was approached by Donald Lang and guitarist Ernie Vincent, who operate Kolab Records, to record a compact disc. During this time, Ridgley was a supervisor for community action programs at the Harvey Center. In 2010, Ridgley performed at the Ponderosa Stomp.

Sammy Ridgley died in New Orleans on August 27, 2016. He was 73.

== Personal life ==
Ridgley was the younger brother of recording artist Tommy Ridgley. Ridgley was active in the Shrewsbury community and belonged to the Young Men's Union Benevolent Association, which is one of the oldest organizations in Jefferson Parish dating from 1801.
