= William Ridgley Morris =

American politician (1811–1889)

Personal details
- Born: 1811 Dover, Delaware, U.S.
- Died: February 27, 1889 (aged 77–78) near Dover, Delaware, U.S.
- Party: People's
- Spouse: Catherine Harris
- Children: 2
- Education: Yale College
- Occupation: Politician; diplomat; farmer; lawyer

William Ridgley Morris (1811 – February 27, 1889) was an American politician, diplomat, and lawyer from Delaware and Pennsylvania. He served in the Pennsylvania House of Representatives.

== Early life ==
William Ridgley Morris was born in 1811 in Dover, Delaware, to William Morris. His father was a physician in Dover. He graduated from Yale College in 1830. He studied law for three years with John M. Clayton of Dover.

== Career ==
Morris was elected as clerk of the Delaware Senate. He then moved to York, Pennsylvania, and served as prosecuting attorney for York County. In 1849, President Zachary Taylor appointed him as Consul of St. Thomas.

After returning to the United States, Morris continued practicing law in Philadelphia. He then represented Philadelphia in the Pennsylvania House of Representatives.

In the spring of 1856, he moved back to Dover and started a fruit farm near town. He spent time writing poetry. In 1858, he was nominated by the People's Party for U.S. Congress, but was defeated. During the Civil War, he supported the Union cause. Following the war, he worked for the federal government in Washington, D.C.

== Personal life ==
Morris married Catherine Harris, daughter of George Washington Harris and great-granddaughter of John Harris Sr. They had a son and daughter, Walter and Mrs. Caleb S. Penniwill.

Morris died on February 27, 1889, at his home near Dover.
