= Jeff Barry =

American pop music songwriter, singer, and record producer (born 1938)

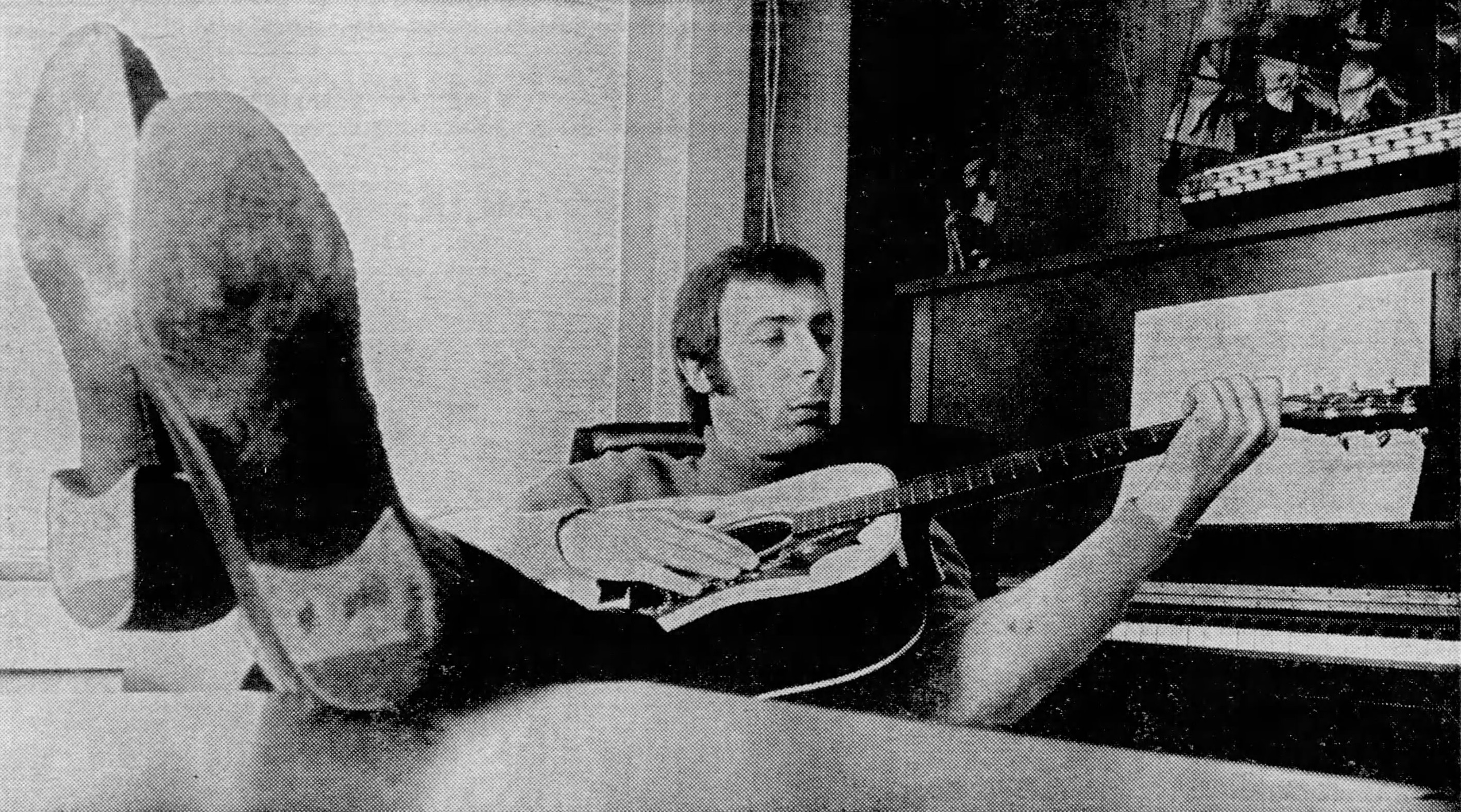
- Barry in 1969

Background information
- Born: Joel Adelberg; April 3, 1938 (age 88); New York City, U.S.
- Genres: Rock and roll; pop music
- Occupations: Songwriter; singer; record producer
- Years active: 1958–present
- Labels: Red Bird; RCA; United Artists; Bell; A&M

Jeff Barry (born Joel Adelberg; April 3, 1938) is an American pop music songwriter, singer, and record producer. Among the most successful songs that he has co-written in his career are "Tell Laura I Love Her" (written with Ben Raleigh and a number 1 hit in the UK Singles Chart when it was recorded by Ricky Valance and number 7 in the US as sung by Ray Peterson), "Do Wah Diddy Diddy", "Da Doo Ron Ron", "Then He Kissed Me", "Be My Baby", "Chapel of Love", and "River Deep - Mountain High" (all written with his then-wife Ellie Greenwich and Phil Spector); "Leader of the Pack" (written with Greenwich and Shadow Morton); "Sugar, Sugar" (written with Andy Kim); "Without Us" (written with Tom Scott), and "I Honestly Love You" (written with Peter Allen).

== Early life ==
Barry was born in East Flatbush, Brooklyn to a Jewish family, the same neighborhood his future wife Ellie Greenwich was also born in. His parents divorced when he was seven, and his mother moved him and his sister to Plainfield, New Jersey, where they resided for several years before returning to New York.

== Chart success ==
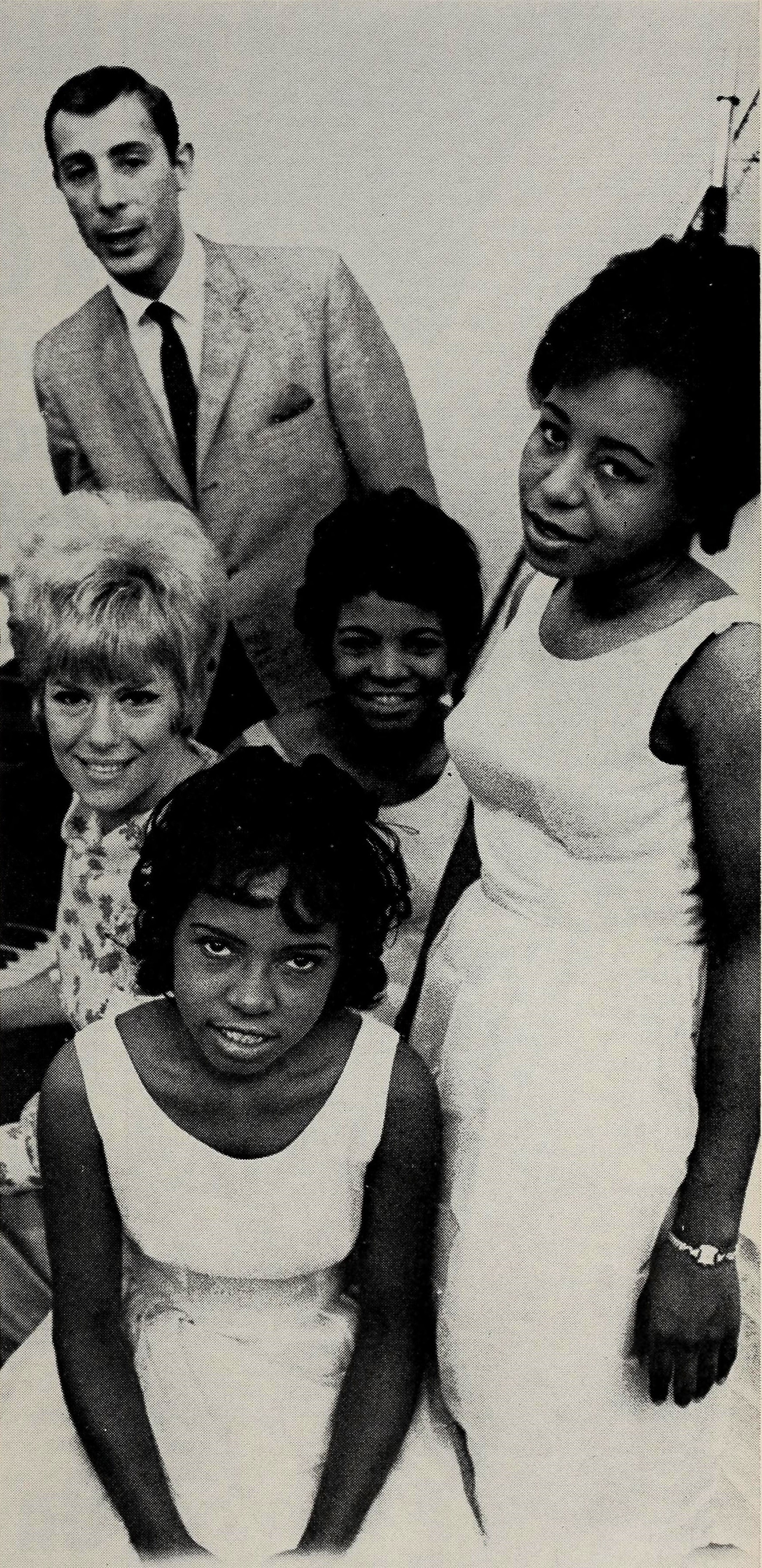
Barry and Ellie Greenwich with the Dixie Cups on the cover of Cash Box, August 29, 1964

In 1964, Leiber and Stoller brought Barry and Greenwich on board their new label, Red Bird Records, as songwriter-producers. Of Red Bird's first 20 releases, 15 hit the charts; all were written and/or produced by the Barry-Greenwich team, including "Chapel of Love", "People Say", and "Iko Iko" by the Dixie Cups, and "Remember (Walkin' in the Sand)" (co-produced by Artie Ripp) and "Leader of the Pack" by the Shangri-Las.

In late 1966, Barry was asked to produce tracks for the Monkees, a music group put together specifically as the stars of an NBC sitcom, also called The Monkees. Drafted by the show's musical supervisor, Don Kirshner, Barry brought with him a few tunes penned by Neil Diamond for the group to record. One among them, "I'm a Believer", under Barry's production, would sail up the U.S. charts to No. 1 and become one of the biggest-selling records of all time. The group also had a hit with another single composed by Diamond and produced by Barry, "A Little Bit Me, a Little Bit You". After Kirshner's dismissal from Colgems Records, however, Barry would not produce songs for the Monkees again until 1970's Changes, which contained many songs co-written by Barry, and their 1971 single "Do It in the Name of Love".

Having been removed from the Monkees project, Kirshner became music supervisor for a new Saturday morning cartoon, The Archie Show, in 1968, and enlisted Barry as producer and main songwriter. During the next three years, Barry composed dozens of songs for the fictional Archies group, including the show's theme, "Everything's Archie", and the "Dance of the Week" (a staple of the show's first season). Barry had also recently founded his own label, Steed Records, and one of his most successful recording artists was Montreal native Andy Kim, who had hits with remakes of Barry's Ronettes tunes "Be My Baby" and "Baby, I Love You". Barry and Kim collaborated on several tunes for the Archies to record, including their best-known single, "Sugar, Sugar", which hit No. 1, became the RIAA Record of the Year for 1969, and earned the group a gold record.

In 1969, Barry penned his first music for motion pictures (in the films Hello Down There and Where It's At), and wrote the music for and produced Tom Eyen's hit off-Broadway revue The Dirtiest Show in Town. The following year, he wrote and produced singles and albums for Archies lead singer Ron Dante, Bobby Bloom ("Montego Bay"), and Robin McNamara ("Lay a Little Lovin' on Me"), among others. In 1975, Barry produced "Ooh, I'm Satisfied" for the briefly successful mid-'70s pop singer and later session vocalist Polly Cutter.

== Production and film work ==
In 1971 Barry moved from New York to California, where he had a production and administration deal with A&M Records for several years. Between 1972 and 1975, he produced hit singles for Nino Tempo and April Stevens (together and separately) and the a cappella vocal group the Persuasions. In subsequent years he shifted his focus to television (writing the theme songs for One Day at a Time, The Jeffersons, and Family Ties) and movies (the score for 1980's The Idolmaker), although he continued his work in the pop music field. "I Honestly Love You", written by Barry with Peter Allen, became a 1974 No. 1 for Olivia Newton-John; and, in 1984, Jeffrey Osborne and Joyce Kennedy hit the Top 40 with another Barry composition, "The Last Time I Made Love", written with Barry Mann and Cynthia Weil.

During the 1970s and 1980s Barry also scored numerous hit songs on the country charts, among them "Out of Hand" by Gary Stewart, "Sayin' Hello, Sayin' I Love You, Sayin' Goodbye" by Jim Ed Brown and Helen Cornelius, "Lie to You for Your Love" by the Bellamy Brothers, a remake of "Chip Chip" (originally a 1962 Gene McDaniels pop smash) by Patsy Sledd, and "Walkin' in the Sun" by Glen Campbell.

In 1990, Barry co-produced the theme song for the television series based on Where's Waldo? with media executive Richard Goldsmith. Barry and Goldsmith would collaborate throughout the 90s on a number of projects, including children's albums based on The Babysitter's Club and Clifford the Big Red Dog, songs for the interstitial series Nounou Time, the Spanish language series Mi casita, theme songs for The Slow Norris and Someday School, and would executive produce the 1998 film Jack Frost.

In May 1991, Barry and Greenwich were inducted into the Songwriters Hall of Fame. In 2004, Rolling Stone's list of the 500 greatest rock songs included six Greenwich-Barry compositions, more than by any other non-performing songwriting team.

During the mid-1990s, Barry served as president of the National Academy of Songwriters, and in December 1998 he was a recipient of their Lifetime Achievement Award. In March 2000, Barry filmed a music special for the PBS television network, Chapel of Love: Jeff Barry and Friends. The show featured performances of Barry tunes by several of the artists who made them famous, including the Dixie Cups, the Crystals, Ronnie Spector, Andy Kim, Ray Peterson, and Ron Dante of the Archies.

In recent years, Barry has been involved in several projects, among them the stage musical The Girl Who Would Be King, written by the husband-and-wife team of Prudence Fraser and Robert Sternin, best known for their writing and production work on the CBS series The Nanny. The musical had its official world premiere in Vero Beach, Florida.

In 2016, Barry composed songs for the musical theater show Jambalaya the Musical along with his production partner, Clarence Jey, a US Billboard and viral record producer. Jeff Barry was involved in part of the music in the Hallmark Channel movie titled My Christmas Love.

In 2019, Barry and his writing partner Clarence Jey composed and wrote songs for Lego City Adventures, an animated television series, produced by The Lego Group, for Nickelodeon television that aired from 2019 to 2022.

In 2025, Barry served as one of the songwriters for A Chuck E. Cheese Christmas, along with his son, Jon Colton Barry.

== Awards and honors ==
Barry and Greenwich were among the 2010 recipients of the Ahmet Ertegün Award from the Rock and Roll Hall of Fame. As he was unable to attend the ceremony, Steven Van Zandt accepted the award on Barry's behalf. Jeff Barry and Ellie Greenwich were inducted into the Songwriters Hall of Fame in 1991.
