= Bobby Powell (musician) =

American singer (born 1943)

Bobby Henderson Powell (born July 25, 1943) is an American rhythm and blues and gospel singer and pianist.

== Biography ==
He was born near Winnfield, Louisiana, and attended the Louisiana State School for the Negro Blind at Southern University in Baton Rouge. After singing in gospel groups, he began singing R&B and recorded for local entrepreneur and record producer Lionel Whitfield's Whit record label in Shreveport, releasing "What Are You Trying to Do to Me" in 1965. His second single, a version of "C.C. Rider", reached number one on the national Cash Box R&B chart, number 12 on the Billboard R&B chart and number 76 on the pop chart at the start of 1966, and his follow-up, "Do Something For Yourself", reached number 36 on the R&B chart. Reviewer Colin Larkin commented on his single "I'm Gonna Leave You", "which with its stinging blues guitar and a shouting gospel chorus ranked as one of the funkiest, most down-home soul records in history."

Powell continued to record for Whit, releasing a string of singles through the late 1960s in a style similar to Clarence Carter, and had his final chart entry in 1971 with his version of Baby Washington's hit, "The Bells" (number 45 R&B). He also recorded an LP for Excello Records, Thank You, in 1973. In the mid-1970s he moved to the Hep' Me label in New Orleans, and continued to release singles for the remainder of the decade. He also recorded the album Bobby Powell Explains The Glory Of Love, in 1981, and several albums of gospel music, as well as continuing to perform in Baton Rouge.

As of 2016, Powell makes occasional appearances performing gospel music in Baton Rouge.
