= Tommy Ridgley =

American R&B singer, pianist, songwriter and bandleader (1925–1999)

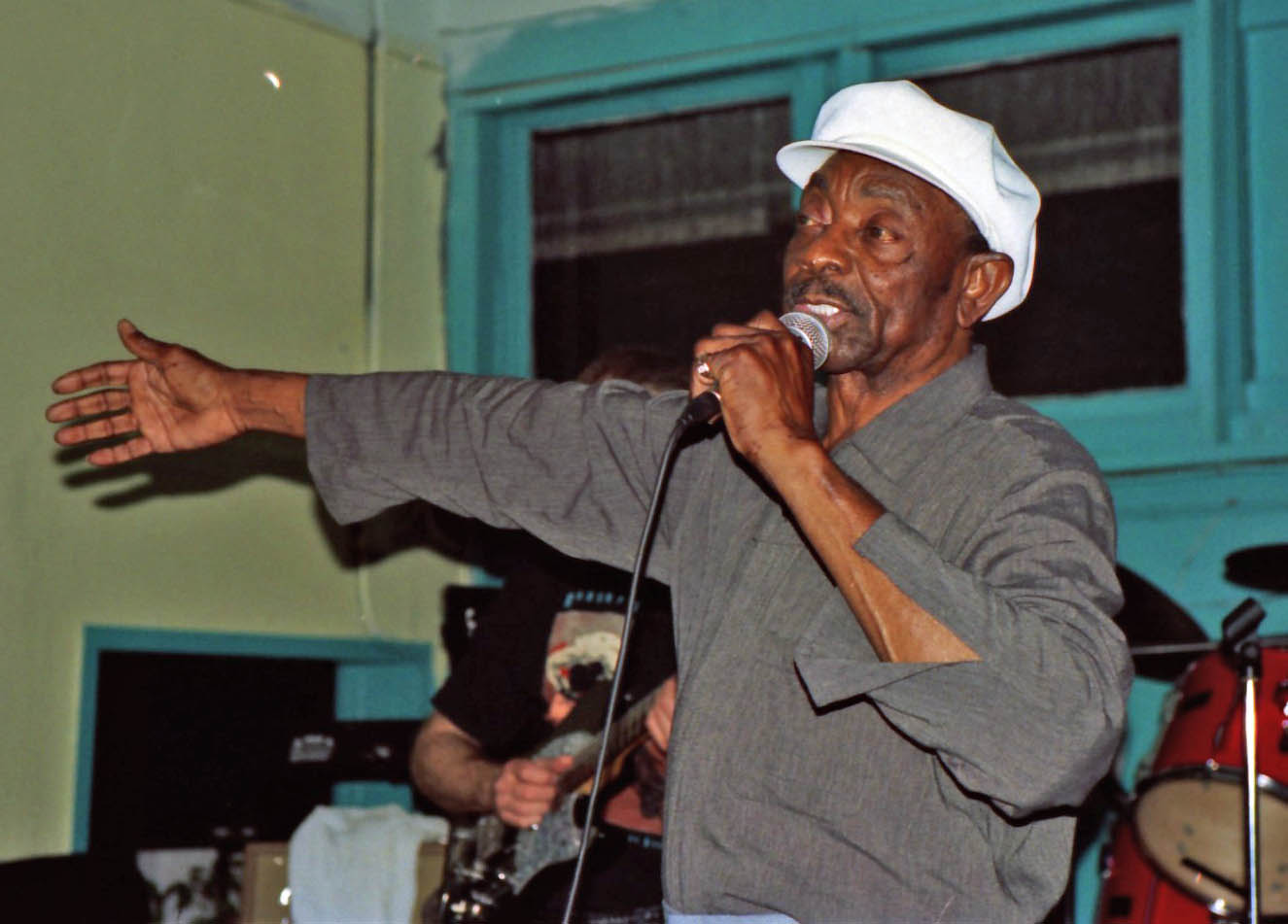
- Tommy Ridgley at the Dream Palace in New Orleans (1996)

Background information
- Born: Thomas Herman Ridgley; October 30, 1925; New Orleans, Louisiana, United States
- Died: August 11, 1999 (aged 73) Metairie, Louisiana
- Genres: Blues, R&B
- Occupations: Musician, singer, piano player
- Instruments: Vocals, piano
- Years active: 1949–1999
- Labels: Imperial, Decca, Herald, Atlantic, Ric, Ronn, River City, Black Top
- Website: Tommyridgley.com/

Thomas Herman Ridgley (October 30, 1925 – August 11, 1999) was an American R&B singer, pianist, songwriter and bandleader in New Orleans, Louisiana. In a musical career lasting half a century Ridgley was a stalwart of the New Orleans rhythm and blues scene. Although he never had a national hit, unlike several of his contemporaries, he made numerous, popular recordings that sold mainly in New Orleans and Louisiana beginning in 1949 with a final release in 1995. His voice was variously described as similar to Roy Brown and Bull Moose Jackson and thus able to adapt to a variety of styles: blues, jump blues, rhythm and blues and soul. In the late 1950s, he became bandleader of The Untouchables with whom he held residencies at important night venues often backing visiting artists. His recording career consisted of over forty singles and three albums. Most of his recordings have been anthologised on compilations in vinyl and CDs.

== Biography ==
=== Early life ===
Tommy Ridgley was born in the Shrewsbury district of New Orleans, the eldest of seventeen brothers and sisters, of which eight survived He had an impoverished upbringing and was a breadwinner for his family before his teens. His social life and that of his family centred on the local church where Ridgley began singing in harmony groups He served with the United States Navy during the Second World War and during his rest-time learnt to play the piano. At demobilization under the terms of the G.I. Bill, that provided World War II veterans with funds for college education Ridgley studied at the Grunewald School of Music. In 1946 he entered a talent contest at the Dew Drop Inn, one of New Orleans premier nightclubs which he won and more significantly gained a profile as an up-coming performer.

== Career ==
=== Dave Bartholomew Orchestra ===
Ridgley started his professional career in the late 40's as a band singer with a New Orleans Dixieland group and after a brief stint with Earl Anderson's band playing at The Starlight Hotel in Gert Town, (Note: The Starlight Hotel and Lounge opened in 1946 and managed by Odile Clark Washington (1909 - 2020) was a major venue for black musicians during the 50's through to the 80s.) he was recruited by trumpeter and band leader Dave Bartholomew. Ridgley, released his debut single, Shrewsbury Blues c/w Early Dawn Boogie in New Orleans in 1949. (Note: The success of Shrewsbury Blues led to Ridgley being billed as the 'Shrewsbury Kid' for a number of releases on Park and Imperial.) Produced by Bartholomew and released on the new imprint Imperial Records the record established Ridgley within New Orleans as a progenitor of jump blues and blues ballads. A competent songwriter Ridgley wrote both sides of the follow-up I Live My Life c/w Lavinia. In 1952 Lew Chudd, owner of Imperial records selected Ridgley and Bartholomew to cover a song called Looped. It was another New Orleans hit and thereafter a staple of Tommy Ridgley's repertoire. A Dave Bartholomew Orchestra single with Ridgley on lead Tra La La issued on Decca was later covered by Pat Boone. Ridgley's singing style in his early career has been compared to that of Roy Brown whilst his reputation as a major New Orleans artist was enhanced by Dave Bartholomew's band that featured outstanding musicians: drummer Earl Palmer and saxophonists Lee Allen, Herb Hardesty, Red Tyler and Ernest Allen

In 1953 Ridgley left Bartholomew's band and signed a contract with Atlantic records. He cut I'm Gonna Cross That River c/w Ooh Lawdy My Baby, a record that featured Ray Charles on piano as a member of Edgar Blanchard's Gondoliers and Jam Up (1954), a sax-led instrumental dance record that narrowly missed the national charts when re-released as Jam Up Twist in 1962. A regular presence by 1957 on the thriving R&B scene in New Orleans, he was offered a recording contract with Herald Records, by which time Ridgley had formed his own band The Untouchables. Herald released six singles by The Untouchables of which the first release When I Meet My Girl was the most successful. As a marketing ploy Herald used the nickname The New King of The Stroll following the death of the original 'king' Chuck Willis in 1958. By the end of 1950s, Tommy Ridgley and The Untouchables were the resident band at the iconic Dew Drop Inn where they opened for and sometimes backed visiting acts. These included a number of major R&B artists of the late 50's and early 60's: James Brown, Clyde McPhatter, Sam Cooke, Little Willie John and Ivory Joe Hunter . Ridgley also employed a young Irma Thomas as one of his girl singers, later recommending her to Ric Records where she recorded for the subsidiary Ron label.

=== Joe Ruffino's Ric records ===
In 1960, Ridgley also signed with Joe Ruffino's New Orleans Ric Records, and released seven singles, at six monthly intervals. His third release, a recording of Wynona Carr's Should I Ever Love Again c/w Double-Eyed Whammy was a strong seller in spring 1961, the latter covered by Freddy King in 1966 His fifth release on Ric In The Same Old Way proved one of the most successful records of his career and he later cut it again on the Shreveport based label Ronn label. Joe Ruffino's death in 1962 left the label in limbo and Ridgley's final two Ric 45s, both of which featured Dr.John on production duties, were released with little in the way of promotion and consequently were not successful. However, Heavenly c/w Honest I Do and I’ve Heard That Story Before, the latter covered by his brother Sammy Ridgley demonstrated that Ridgley could adapt his voice to the new soul music style that was evolving

A one-record deal with the tiny Cinderella label saw No One But You released in the winter of 1963. In February 1964 Cash Box reviewed favourably All My Love Belongs To You c/w I Want Some Money, on the Johen label, a R&B dance record from the pen of Eddie Bo. As the decade progressed Tommy Ridgley continued to gig regularly in New Orleans and Louisiana releasing further one-off soul 45s on small labels: Blue Jay, White Cliffs and Ronn. Ridgley also cut a number of tracks at a studio in Clinton, Mississippi for Bob Robin's International City imprint including My Love is Getting Stronger, a song that became highly popular on the UK Northern Soul scene in the 1970s and 80s.

During the 1970s and 1980s, there were fewer recording opportunities for Ridgley, however, he intermittently continued to record for a plethora of local New Orleans and Louisiana record labels.These included Sometimes You Get It for Allen Toussaint's Sansu label in 1976 and a remake of Ridgley's own I Can't Make It Any Longer on Hep' Me Records, a label owned by Senator Jones. Throughout this period Ridgley continued to perform around New Orleans whilst accepting occasional European dates.The Untouchables maintained their residency at the Dew Drop Inn until it closed in 1972 and Ridgley kept performing at the New Orleans Jazz & Heritage Festival every year from 1972 until his death in 1999, a continuous appearance of twenty eight years.

=== Modern Blues LP ===
In 1992 and nearly 50 years into his music career Ridgley released his first album of new recordings. (Note: In the 1980s there were a number of cassette only recordings of new material on the Du Bat label and The Sound of New Orleans label.) Appearing on Modern Blues Recordings and titled She Turns Me On it was a varied mix of Jump blues, New Orleans funk and sweet, soulful ballads. It included re-cuts of a number of Ridgley favourites including, I Want Some Money and Jam Up. The Sound of New Orleans label also released an album How Long? during 1992, although the recordings originated from around the turn of the decade. A final album Since The Blues Began on Black Top Records appeared in 1995. In recognition of his long career in New Orleans he was supported by established musicians that included George Porter Jr., Raymond Weber and guest guitarist Snooks Eaglin all of whom turned out on his last recorded album. (Note: Ridgley's recordings for Herald and Ric have been frequently anthologised as have his releases as a lead singer with the Dave Bartholomew Orchestra)

In January 1999, Ridgley received OffBeat magazine's annual Lifetime Achievement Award Ridgley who suffered from kidney failure in his last few years, died from lung cancer, caused by asbestos inhalation, whilst working as a construction worker, in August 1999.

== Discography ==
=== Singles ===
- Shrewsbury Blues / Early Dawn Boogie (Imperial 5054, 1/50)
- Boogie Woogie Mama / Lonely Man Blues (Imperial 5074, 5/50)
- Lavinia / I Live My Life (Imperial 5198, 7/52)
- Looped / Junie Mae (Imperial 5203, 9/52)
- Monkey Man / Nobody Cares (Imperial 5214, 12/52)
- Good Times / A Day Is Coming (Imperial 5223, 2/53)
- Ooh Lawdy My Baby / I'm Gonna Cross That River (Atlantic 1009, 10/53)
- Jam Up [instrumental] / Wish I Had Never (Atlantic 1039, 9/54)
- When I Meet My Girl / What'cha Gonna Do (Herald 501, 6/57)
- Baby Do Liddle / Just A Memory (Herald 508, 11/57)
- Woncha Gone / Come Back Baby (Herald 513, 2/58)
- Mairzy Doats And Dozy Doats / I've Heard That Story Before (Herald 526, 8/58)
- I'll Be True / The Girl Across The Street (Herald 537, 2/59)
- Tina / How I Feel (Herald 540, 9/59)
- Is It True / Let's Try And Talk It Over (Ric 968, 4/60)
- Please Hurry Home / Do You Remember (Ric 973, 8/60)
- Should I Ever Love Again / Double-Eye Whammy (Ric 978, 3/61)
- Three Times / The Only Girl For Me (Ric 982, 7/61)
- In The Same Old Way / The Girl From Kooka Monga (Ric 984, 11/61)
- Jam Up Twist / Wish I Had Never (Atlantic 2136, 2/62) re-release
- My Ordinary Girl / She's Got What It Takes (Ric 990, 7/62)
- Heavenly / I Love You Yes I Do (Ric 993, ?/63)
- I've Heard That Story Before / Honest I Do (Ric 994, ?/63)
- No One But You / The Goose (Cinderella 1204, 11/63)
- I Want Some Money Baby / All My Love Belongs To You (Johen 9200, 2/64)
- Call On My Baby / Pretty Little Mama (Blue Jay 158, ?/65)
- Did You Tell Him / Hey Little Chick (White Cliffs 260, 5/67)
- My Love Gets Stronger / Fly In My Pie (International City 7102, 5/68)
- I'm Asking Forgiveness / There Is Something On Your Mind (River City 728, ?/69)
- In The Same Old Way / I'm Not The Same Person (Ronn 36, 9/69)
- Spreading Love / Live (Ridge-Way R-0005, ?/70)

=== LPs ===
- 1992 How Long? (Sound of New Orleans)
- 1992 She Turns Me On (Modern Blues Recordings)
- 1995 Since The Blues Began (Black Top)

=== Compilations ===
- 1977 Through The Years (Sound of New Orleans) (USA)
- 1986 Tommy Ridgley: The early 50's in New Orleans (Pathé Marconi) (France)
- 1988 The New Orleans King of the Stroll (Rounder) (USA)
- 1992 The Herald Recordings (Collectables) (USA)
- 2005 Tommy Ridgley 1949-1954 (Classics) (France)
- 2015 In the Same Old Way: The Complete Ric, Ron and Sho-Biz Recordings (CD shared with Bobby Mitchell) (Ace) (UK)
- 20?? Mardi Gras Jam: Tommy Ridgley & His Orchestra (Blue City) (USA)
