= Red Bird Records =

Defunct American record label

Red Bird label of the Dixie Cups' album

Red Bird Records was a record label founded by American pop music songwriters Jerry Leiber, Mike Stoller, and George Goldner in 1964. Though often thought of as a "girl-group" label, female-led acts made up only 40% of the artist roster on Red Bird and its associated labels (including Blue Cat Records, Tiger and Daisy). However, female-led acts also accounted for more than 90% of the label's charting records.

The label's first release was "Chapel of Love" by the Dixie Cups, which quickly reached number one on the Billboard Hot 100, a feat matched later that year by the Shangri-Las' "Leader of the Pack". Eleven of the first 30 singles released by Red Bird reached the Top Forty.

== History ==
After closing Spark Records (in 1955) and working for Atlantic (1955–1961) then United Artists (1961–1963) and starting Red Bird, Leiber and Stoller brought in George Goldner, a veteran record promoter and former owner of Gee Records, Gone Records and Rama Records. They used the skillful Brill Building husband-and-wife songwriting team of Jeff Barry and Ellie Greenwich, who had been writing most of Phil Spector's first hits. The label was sold in 1966 as Leiber and Stoller preferred to write and produce rather than manage the business of running a label, and after they had a falling-out with Goldner whose gambling debts caused Red Bird to be taken over by the Mafia. Leiber and Stoller sold Red Bird to Goldner for one dollar. Goldner then sold the Red Bird catalogue to raise money.

A subsidiary label, Blue Cat Records, had a hit with "The Boy from New York City" by The Ad Libs.

== Red Bird Records artists ==
- The Butterflys
- The Dixie Cups
- Ral Donner
- Dickie Goodman
- The Jelly Beans
- Andy Kim
- The Poets
- Orpheus
- Tawney Reed
- Alvin Robinson
- Steve Rossi
- The Shangri-Las
- The Trade Winds

== See also ==
- List of record labels
