= Ric Records =

American record label

- Founded: 1959; 67 years ago
- Founder: Joe Ruffino
- Defunct: 1962; 64 years ago
- Genre: R&B, Soul
- Country of origin: United States
- Location: New Orleans

Ric Records, along with sister label Ron Records, were American record labels formed by Joe Ruffino in 1959. Although most of Ric's releases did not rise above regional hits, the label was active during the golden era of New Orleans R&B and was an incubator for many artists who are now recognized as definers of the style.

Example of Ric Records 45 label

After his first taste of the music industry at A-1 Distributors, Joe Ruffino set out on his own with the Ric and Ron imprints, headquartered at 630 Baronne Street in New Orleans. The labels were named after Joe's two sons. Ric Records was focused exclusively on releasing local New Orleans talent. Edgar Blanchard was brought in to help with studio arrangements, and supervised all early Ric studio sessions. He was later replaced by Harold Battiste. Mac Rebennack (later "Dr. John") was also brought on as label president and helped with writing and producing.

Artists on the label included Eddie Bo, Johnny Adams, Lenny Capello, Al Johnson, Tommy Ridgley and Joe Jones. Jones provided Ric with its only sizeable hit, "You Talk Too Much", which peaked at No. 3 on the Billboard Hot 100 in late 1960. This record was the cause of legal issues with New York City-based outfit Roulette Records, for which Joe Jones previously recorded a version of the tune.

Sister label Ron Records had a similar focus on local talent. Artists released include Professor Longhair (local favorite "Go to the Mardi Gras"), Irma Thomas, Bobby Mitchell, Eddie Lang (not to be confused with the jazz guitarist Eddie Lang) and Martha Carter. After being discovered in a local club by Tommy Ridgley, Irma Thomas recorded her first single "(You Can Have My Husband but) Don't Mess with My Man" for Ron within a week. She is now recognized as an important American singer, and was inducted into the Louisiana Music Hall of Fame in 2007.

The Ric and Ron labels became dormant in 1962 when Joe Ruffino died. Ruffino's brother in law Joe Assunt, owner of the One Stop Records store procured the Ric and Ron tapes and reissued various popular titles for the next decade, adding a couple of Johnny Adams 45s to the label listings. On Assunto's death in August 1981 the tapes passed to his daughter Joel Ann Mcgregor.
