= James "Sugar Boy" Crawford =

New Orleans, US R&B musician (1934–2012)

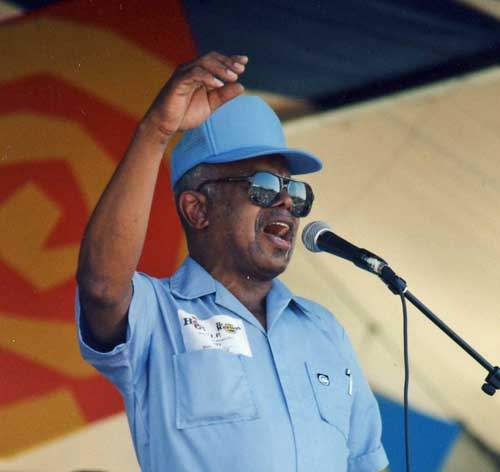
- Crawford in a rare appearance at the New Orleans Jazz & Heritage Festival in 1996 as a guest of his grandson, Davell Crawford

Background information
- Born: James Crawford; October 12, 1934; New Orleans, Louisiana, United States
- Died: September 15, 2012 (aged 77) New Orleans, Louisiana, United States
- Genres: Rhythm and blues
- Occupation: Singer
- Instruments: Vocals, piano
- Years active: 1950–1969
- Labels: Aladdin, Ace, Checker Records, Imperial, Specialty

James "Sugar Boy" Crawford, Jr. (October 12, 1934 – September 15, 2012) was an American R&B musician based in New Orleans. He was the author of "Jock-A-Mo" (1954), which was later rerecorded as "Iko Iko" by the Dixie Cups, and became a huge hit. The song was recorded by many other artists, including Dr. John, Belle Stars, the Grateful Dead, Cyndi Lauper, and (as "Geto Boys") by Glass Candy.

== Life and career ==
Starting out on trombone, Crawford formed a band, which a local DJ, Doctor Daddy-O, named the Chapaka Shawee (Creole for "We Aren't Raccoons"), the title of an instrumental that they played. Crawford recalled, "During high school we had a little band, nothing real organized at first. I was back playing piano... The other fellows in the band were Edgar "Big Boy" Myles, Warren Myles, Nolan Blackwell, Irving "Cat" Banister, and Alfred Bernard- just a bunch of youngsters having fun." The group was signed by Chess Records president Leonard Chess and was renamed Sugar Boy and his Cane Cutters.

His song "Jock-A-Mo" became a standard at the New Orleans Mardi Gras, but Crawford disappeared from public view. In a 2002 interview for Offbeat magazine, he described how his career came to an abrupt halt in 1963, after a severe beating at the hands of state troopers incapacitated him for two years, forcing him to leave the music industry. In 1969, he decided to sing only in church. In 2012, he made a guest appearance singing gospel in an episode of the HBO series Treme. He died one month before the episode aired. James "Sugar Boy" Crawford was also Inducted into The Louisiana Music Hall Of Fame.

Crawford appeared on the 1995 album Let Them Talk, by Davell Crawford, his grandson. He made some stage appearances with Davell, including one at the New Orleans Jazz & Heritage Festival in 1996 and at the seventh annual Ponderosa Stomp in April 2008.

Among the artists Crawford recorded with was Snooks Eaglin.

Crawford died after a brief illness in a hospice in 2012, aged 77.
