= 1991 in the United Kingdom =

Events from the year 1991 in the United Kingdom.

== Incumbents ==
- Monarch – Elizabeth II
- Prime Minister – John Major (Conservative)

== Events ==
=== January ===
- January – Tax-exempt special savings accounts (TESSAs) are introduced as a government concession to promote personal savings.
- 3 January – The UK expels all Iraqi diplomats from the country due to the Iraqi government's illegal annexation of Kuwait five months earlier.
- 5 January – 27 people die as a result of gale-force winds across Britain.
- 8 January – A train crash at Cannon Street station in London kills one person and injures over 500.
- 11 January – As the recession deepens, 335 employees at the Peugeot car factory in Coventry are made redundant, while Ford is looking for up to 1,000 voluntary redundancies at its British factories. Thousands of jobs in the financial services sector are reportedly at threat, as the total UK unemployment figure is currently standing at nearly 1,800,000, but is expected to rise to well over 2,000,000 by the end of the year.
- 16 January – The final phase of the M40 motorway through Oxfordshire is opened, giving the West Midlands conurbation its first direct motorway link with London.
- 17 January – The Gulf War begins, as the Royal Air Force joins Allied aircraft in bombing raids on Iraq.
- 18 January – In spite of the deepening recession, the Conservatives have climbed back to the top of the opinion polls, a MORI poll placing them five points ahead of Labour on 46%.
- 19 January – It is announced that unemployment has reached more than 1.8 million, and experts warn that the figure will exceed 2 million later this year.
- 29 January – John Major resists calls from the Labour Party for interest rates to be cut in a bid to combat the recession.

=== February ===
- 7 February – The Provisional Irish Republican Army launch a mortar attack against 10 Downing Street in London, blowing in all the windows of the cabinet room, during a session of the War Cabinet, but there are no injuries.
- 8 February – Heavy snow disrupts the country for a second time during the winter 1990–1991 season as Britain experiences a prolonged cold snap.
- 17 February – Barclays Bank is reported to be on the verge of axing more than 13,000 employees.
- 18 February – Bombings of Paddington and Victoria stations in London early this morning by the Provisional Irish Republican Army kill one person.
- 21 February – English-born ballet legend Dame Margot Fonteyn dies of cancer aged 71 in Panama City.
- 26 February – English scientist Tim Berners-Lee introduces WorldWideWeb, the first web browser, while working at CERN in Geneva; the first website goes online on 6 August.
- 27 February – The National Institute of Economic and Social Research predicts that the recession will end this summer.
- 28 February – Iraq accepts a provisional ceasefire, and British troops halt their advance on Baghdad.

=== March ===
- 3 March – An Ipsos MORI poll shows that John Major is more popular with his voters than his Conservative government.
- 8 March – Ribble Valley, the tenth safest Conservative constituency in Britain, is won by the Liberal Democrats in a by-election (caused by the departure of David Waddington to the House of Lords).
- 10 March – The UK reportedly has the fastest pace in rising unemployment of all the European Community countries.
- 14 March – The Birmingham Six are freed from prison after 17 years when the Court of Appeal quashes their convictions over the 1974 pub bombings in Birmingham which killed 21 people and injured more than 160 others, a decision anticipated on 25 February by an announcement from Allan Green, Director of Public Prosecution.
- 15 March – Unemployment is now above 2,000,000 for the first time in two years. The number of British workers employed in the manufacturing industry has fallen below 5,000,000 for the first time since records began.
- 19 March – Norman Lamont predicts 2% economic contraction for this year.
- 21 March – Education Secretary Kenneth Clarke announces plans to remove further education and sixth form colleges from local authority control.
- 23 March
  - The Government launches its Citizen's Charter campaign.
  - John Major announces abolition of the unpopular Community Charge ("poll tax"). On 23 April, the government confirms that it is to be replaced by a new Council Tax in 1993.
- 28 March – An inquest in Sheffield into the Hillsborough disaster records a verdict of accidental death on the 95 people who died as a result of the tragedy in 1989. Many of the victims' families criticise the verdict in open court, as many of them had been hoping for a verdict of unlawful killing (which is eventually obtained in 2016), or an open verdict, and for criminal charges to be brought against the police officers who patrolled the game.

=== April ===
- 3 April – Novelist Graham Greene dies aged 86 at his home in Vevey, Switzerland.
- 4 April
  - Social services in the Orkney Islands are criticised for their handling of more than 100 children who have returned to their families after being taken away over allegations of child abuse.
  - The Neath by-election in Wales, caused by the death of Labour MP Donald Coleman on 14 January, is held; Labour retains the seat, with the candidate, Peter Hain, receiving more than half of the vote.
- 8 April – The Football Association announces plans for a new "super league" of eighteen clubs to replace the Football League First Division as the highest division of English football. The move is attacked by smaller Football League clubs, who fear that they could go out of business if TV revenue is confined to the proposed super league.
- 18 April – Despite the continuing recession, the Conservatives are still top of the opinion polls as the latest MORI poll puts them two points ahead of Labour on 42%. The Liberal Democrats have trebled their showing in the last fifteen months, now gaining 15% of the vote.
- 19 April – George Carey is enthroned as Archbishop of Canterbury.

=== May ===
- 5 May – Hopes for a quick end to the recession are boosted by CBI predictions that a sharp recovery in business profits will begin shortly.
- 6 May – Arsenal are crowned champions of the Football League.
- 15 May – Manchester United win the European Cup Winners' Cup with a 2–1 win over FC Barcelona of Spain in Rotterdam, the Netherlands. Mark Hughes scores both of their goals to give English clubs a winning return to European competitions after their five-year ban was lifted last year.
- 16 May
  - Unemployment is now at 2,175,000 – the highest figure since late-1988. It is also above the European average for the first time since 1987.
  - The Monmouth by-election in Wales, caused by the death of the sitting Conservative MP, Sir John Stradling Thomas on 29 March, is held; the Conservatives are defeated once again, and Labour gains the seat.
  - Elizabeth II becomes the first British monarch to address the United States Congress during a 13-day royal visit in Washington, D.C.
- 18 May
  - Helen Sharman becomes the first British person in space, flying with the Soyuz TM-12 mission.
  - Tottenham Hotspur win the FA Cup for a record eighth time with a 2–1 win over Nottingham Forest. Midfielder Paul Gascoigne, a multimillion-pound transfer target for Italian side Lazio, suffers cruciate knee ligament damage early in the game and is not expected to play again in 1991.
- 21 May – South Wales, which has some of the worst unemployment rates in Britain, receives a boost when the go-ahead is given for Japanese electrical company Sony to build a new factory in Bridgend that will create 1,400 jobs when it opens in 1993.
- 22 May – Nearly six months after the breakthrough in the Channel Tunnel service tunnel, the breakthrough in the North rail tunnel is achieved. On the same day, road links to the British terminal are improved when the final section of the M20 motorway is opened between Maidstone and Ashford, meaning that the tunnel's unbroken motorway link with London has already been completed an estimated three years before the first trains move between Britain and France.
- 24 May
  - Labour tops a MORI poll for the first time this year, as they stand six points ahead of the Conservatives on 43%.
  - Sutton Manor Colliery at Bold in the Lancashire Coalfield closes, the last in Britain to use a steam winding engine.
- 27 May – Eric Heffer, Labour MP for Liverpool Walton, dies after a long battle against cancer, aged 69.
- 29 May – Economists warn that the economy is still in an "exceptionally steep" recession and that it could be another year before the first real signs of recovery become visible.

=== June ===
- June – Kia, the Korean car company, begin importing cars to the United Kingdom for the first time; initially it will import only the Pride (a rebadged version of the Japanese Mazda 121), but at least one further model is expected to join it by 1994.
- 3 June – The British Army kill three IRA gunmen in Northern Ireland.
- 6 June
  - Labour Party leader Neil Kinnock condemns John Major for high interest rates, as much as 17%, being charged on small businesses by banks.
  - Lipkin Gorman v Karpnale Ltd decided in the House of Lords, foundational in English unjust enrichment law.
- 10 June – The National Gallery in London opens its new Sainsbury Wing to the public.
- 13 June – Unemployment reaches 2.25million, the lowest monthly rise reported this year.
- 14 June
  - Two long-serving actors both die aged 83 on the same day: Dame Peggy Ashcroft in London, and Bernard Miles (Lord Miles) in Knaresborough.
  - Julie Ann Gibson becomes the first woman to qualify as a pilot with the Royal Air Force.
- 19 June – Secretary of State for Employment Michael Howard announces a £230,000,000 plan to tackle rising unemployment.
- 20 June – Murder of Harry Collinson: A local government officer is shot dead in a planning dispute in County Durham in front of media cameras.
- 25 June – Nissan, the Japanese carmaker with a plant at Sunderland, starts "price wars" by reducing the cost of its cars in order to boost flagging sales brought on by the recession.
- 27 June – Criminal Procedure (Insanity and Unfitness to Plead) Act 1991 (coming into effect from 1992) provides that, if the accused in a criminal trial in England and Wales is found unfit to plead, then a trial of the facts before a jury may be held.
- 28 June
  - Seven months after her resignation as Prime Minister, Margaret Thatcher announces that she will stand down as a Member of parliament at the next general election, which has to be held within the next twelve months.
  - The final breakthrough in the Channel Tunnel is achieved when the last section of clay in the South rail tunnel is bored away.

=== July ===
- July
  - South African-produced cars are imported to Britain for the first time, with the launch of the Sao Penza, a rebadged version of the Mazda 323. However, the brand and the car is not a success and imports end just 2 years later.
  - Production of the Vauxhall Belmont compact saloon ends ahead of the launch of the third generation Astra range of hatchbacks and estates which goes on sale in the Autumn with saloon and convertible models arriving later.
- 3 July – Michael Shorey is convicted at the Old Bailey of the July 1990 murders of Elaine Forsyth and Patricia Morrison, two estate agents with whom he shared a basement flat in north London. He is sentenced to two terms of life imprisonment. The former EastEnders actress Sandy Ratcliff, who provided Shorey with an alibi for the night of the murders, is subsequently convicted of perjury.
- 4 July – The Liverpool Walton by election, caused by the death of the sitting Labour MP Eric Heffer on 27 May, is held; Labour holds the seat, with new MP Peter Kilfoyle gaining more than half of the vote.
- 5 July – The Bank of England closes down the Bank of Credit and Commerce International amid fraud allegations. Several local authorities in the UK lose millions of pounds in investments held with the bank.
- 8 July – Provisional Irish Republican Army members Nessan Quinlivan and Pearse McAuley, detained on charges of conspiracy to murder, shoot their way out of Brixton Prison in London.
- 11 July – Labour MP Terry Fields joins the list of people jailed for refusal to pay the poll tax after he receives a sixty-day prison sentence. He is the first MP to be jailed for refusing to pay the controversial tax which was introduced early last year.
- 15 July – 17th G7 summit held in London.
- 16 July – A government survey of children's school reading reveals that Roald Dahl, who died eight months earlier, has now overtaken Enid Blyton as the most popular author of children's books.
- 17 July – The Ultimate steel roller coaster, Europe's longest, opens at Lightwater Valley theme park in North Yorkshire.
- 18 July – Economists warn that unemployment will reach 3,000,000 people (a level not seen since early-1987) by the end of next year.
- 19 July – Dean Saunders becomes the most expensive footballer to be signed by an English club when he joins Liverpool in a £2.9million transfer from Derby County.
- 21 July – Motor racing driver Paul Warwick, 21, is killed when his car crashes into a barrier during the fifth Formula 3000 race at Oulton Park.
- 23 July – The Ministry of Defence proposes the merger of 22 army regiments as part of a general reform programme.
- 24 July – Chancellor of the Exchequer Norman Lamont assures the House of Commons that the economic recovery will begin before the end of this year.

=== August ===
- 8 August – Lebanon hostage crisis: John McCarthy, a British journalist held hostage in Lebanon for over five years, is freed.
- 12 August – Every job vacancy is being chased by 22 applicants, reports The Times.
- 16 August – The Bank of England declares that the worst of the current recession is now over.
- 23 August – Growing confidence over economic recovery has helped boost the Conservative government's popularity, as they return to the top of the MORI poll with a two-point lead over Labour putting them on 42%.
- 26 August – One Canada Square at Canary Wharf in London becomes the tallest building in the UK.
- 30 August
  - Scottish runner Liz McColgan becomes the first British gold medalist at the World Athletics Championships in Tokyo, Japan.
  - Rioting breaks out on the Ely council estate in Cardiff.

=== September ===
- September – Gordon Roddick and A. John Bird launch The Big Issue, a then-monthly magazine to be sold by homeless people in response to growing number of rough sleepers on the streets of London.
- 3 September
  - Following the recent outbreaks of violence in Leeds and Cardiff, rioting breaks out at Handsworth in Birmingham, Kates Hill in Dudley and Blackbird Leys in Oxford.
  - Premiere of the BBC One television comedy 2point4 Children which stars Belinda Lang and Gary Olsen.
- 9 September – Rioting breaks out on the Meadow Well council estate on Tyneside, with local youths attacking police officers following the recent death of two local teenagers in a police pursuit. Racially motivated attacks on Asian owned shops also involve looting and arson.
- 12 September – Unemployment has hit 2,400,000 – the highest level since the spring of 1988 – completing a 50% rise in just over a year. However, the rate of rising unemployment is slowing down and retail sales are improving.
- 13 September – Further rioting breaks out in Tyneside.
- 14 September – George Buckley, Labour MP for Hemsworth in West Yorkshire, dies aged 56.
- 15 September – A poll shows that Labour Party leader Neil Kinnock is a liability to his party, who are now behind John Major's Conservative Party in the opinion polls.
- 17 September – Neil Kinnock hits out at claims that he is to blame for his party falling behind in the opinion polls, sparking speculation that John Major will call a general election within the next two months.
- 19 September – Robin Leigh-Pemberton, governor of the Bank of England, says that he is confident the recession is now over in Britain.
- 20 September – Richard Holt, Conservative MP for Langbaurgh in Cleveland, dies suddenly aged 60.
- 24 September – Lebanon hostage crisis: Kidnappers in Beirut release expatriate ex-Battle of Britain pilot Jackie Mann after over two years in captivity.

=== October ===
- October – Vauxhall launches the third generation of its popular Astra with hatchback and estate models with the saloon and convertible models arriving later.
- 2 October – Just over two weeks after Neil Kinnock was damned by a poll as a "liability" to the Labour Party, the leader and his MPs are celebrating after they overtake the Conservatives by two points in the opinion polls.
- 9 October – A Sumo tournament is hosted at the Royal Albert Hall in London.
- 11 October – John Major outlines his vision of a "classless" Britain at a Conservative Party conference at Blackpool, where his predecessor Margaret Thatcher voices her support for him.
- 16 October – The ITV franchise auction results are announced and many notable names will go off the air, including Thames Television, TVS, TSW, TV-am and ORACLE Teletext. The changes will take effect at midnight on 1 January 1993.
- 17 October – The smallest monthly rise in unemployment since last November is cited by the government as an "unmistakable" sign that the recession is drawing to a close.
- 18 October – Labour's hopes of election success are boosted by the latest MORI poll, which shows them six points ahead of the Conservatives on 45%.
- 19 October – Canadian singer Bryan Adams makes history when his hit single power ballad "(Everything I Do) I Do It for You", which features in the film Robin Hood:Prince of Thieves (released on 14 June this year, and starring Kevin Costner) enters its fifteenth successive week at #1 in the UK singles charts. It loses its position on 27 October after a record sixteen weeks, displaced by U2's "The Fly".
- 22 October – Leonora Knatchbull, the five-year-old daughter of Norton Knatchbull, 8th Baron Brabourne and his wife Penelope, dies after a one-year battle with kidney cancer. She was also a great-grandchild of Lord Louis Mountbatten, who was murdered by the IRA in 1979. She is buried at Romsey Abbey on 26 October.
- 23 October – In the legal case of R v R decided on appeal, the Law Lords unanimously decide that spousal rape is a crime in England and Wales, overturning the principle established by Chief Justice Hale in 1736.
- 29 October – Hopes that the recession is drawing to a close are boosted by CBI findings, which show that manufacturers are now more optimistic than at any time in the past three years.

=== November ===
- November
  - Computer retailer PC World opens its first branch, in Croydon (London).
  - Alan Sked forms the Anti-Federalist League, a political party aiming to field election candidates opposed to the Maastricht Treaty.
- 5 November – Robert Maxwell, owner of numerous business interests including the Daily Mirror newspaper, is found dead off the coast of Tenerife; his cause of death is unconfirmed, but reports suggest that he may have committed suicide.
- 7 November – By-elections are held in Hemsworth, Kincardine and Deeside and Langbaurgh, caused by the deaths of their respective MPs George Buckley of Labour, and Conservatives Alick Buchanan-Smith and Richard Holt. Labour holds Hemsworth under Derek Enright, while the Liberal Democrats gain Kincardine and Deeside from the Conservatives. The Conservatives also lose the Langbaurgh constituency to Labour, with 35-year-old Indian-born candidate Ashok Kumar becoming the new MP.
- 9 November – First ever controlled and substantial production of fusion energy achieved at the Joint European Torus in Oxfordshire.
- 14 November – British and American authorities announce indictments against two Libyan Intelligence Service officials in connection with the downing of Pan Am Flight 103 at Lockerbie in 1988.
- 15 November – Britain's hopes of economic recovery are dealt with a major blow when shares on the Wall Street Stock Exchange fall by 120 points.
- 16 November – Two IRA bombers die in St Albans, Hertfordshire, when a bomb explodes prematurely.
- 18 November – Lebanon hostage crisis: Terry Waite, an Anglican Church envoy held hostage in Lebanon, is freed after four-and-a-half years in captivity.
- 22–23 November – The Communist Party of Great Britain votes to abandon its Marxist–Leninist constitution and reform itself as Democratic Left.
- 23 November – Freddie Mercury, the lead singer of rock band Queen, announces that he is suffering from AIDS, following lengthy media speculation about his health. He dies the following day aged 45 at his home in London from related bronchopneumonia.
- 25 November – The Court of Appeal quashes the convictions of Winston Silcott, Engin Raghip and Mark Braithwaite for the murder of PC Keith Blakelock in the Broadwater Farm riot at Tottenham, North London, six years ago. Raghip and Braithwaite are released from prison, but Silcott remains imprisoned for a separate murder.
- 26 November – Julin Bristol, the last UK nuclear test, takes place at the Nevada Test Site.
- 27 November
  - Freddie Mercury is cremated after a funeral service held at West London Crematorium.
  - The government announces that joyriders who are found guilty should face a maximum penalty of five years imprisonment as well as unlimited fines and unlimited automatic driving bans. Joyriding (recklessly driving stolen cars) has recently surged across Britain, with almost all of those involved being children and teenagers.
- 28 November – First performance of Alan Bennett's play The Madness of George III in London.

=== December ===
- 1 December – Thousands of British shops, including retail giants Asda and Tesco, defy trading laws, and open their doors on a Sunday in a bid to boost trade that has been badly hit by the ongoing recession.
- 5 December – The Robert Maxwell business empire goes into receivership with debts in excess of £1,000,000,000, exactly one month after Robert Maxwell's death. The Daily Mirror reports that Maxwell had wrongly removed £350,000,000 from its pension fund shortly before he died.
- 6 December – At Birmingham Crown Court, John Tanner is convicted of the murder of Rachel McLean on 14 April in Oxford and sentenced to life imprisonment.
- 10 December – Ronald Coase wins the Nobel Prize in Economics "for his discovery and clarification of the significance of transaction costs and property rights for the institutional structure and functioning of the economy".
- 12–15 December – Concentration of vehicle exhausts in London causes an estimated 160 deaths.
- 16 December – Stella Rimington is announced as the first female director general of MI5.
- 19 December – Unemployment is now above 2,500,000 for the first time since early-1988.
- 23 December – Following the death of Freddie Mercury, Queen's "Bohemian Rhapsody" returns to the top of the British singles charts after sixteen years, with the proceeds from the rerelease being donated to the Terence Higgins Trust.
- 27 December – The last MORI poll of 1991 shows that Labour are six points ahead of the Conservatives with 44% of the vote.
- 29 December – A quarterly opinion poll shows that Neil Kinnock and Labour are three points ahead of John Major and the Conservatives, sparking hope for Labour that they will win the next general election (which has to be held within five months) or at least the election will result in a hung parliament for the first time since 1974.

=== Undated ===
- The economy remains rooted in the recession which began last year. Despite the deepening recession, inflation has been substantially decreased to 5.9%.
- The National Curriculum assessment ("standard attainment tests" or SATs) is first carried out, at Key Stage 1 in primary schools in England.
- Scout Groups may admit girls to all their sections.
- Despite the onset of the recession and a sharp fall in new car sales (with fewer than 1,600,000 new cars being sold in 1991 compared to the record of more than 2,300,000 in 1989), Nissan Motor Manufacturing UK's car plant at Sunderland returns a profit for the first time, making £18,400,000 this year. It currently makes only the Primera family saloon and hatchbacks there, but from August next year it will be joined by the new version of the smaller Micra.
- Sea defences at Mappleton in Holderness are built.

== Publications ==
- Martin Amis's novel Time's Arrow.
- Beryl Bainbridge's novel The Birthday Boys.
- Iain M. Banks' short story collection The State of the Art.
- Pat Barker's novel Regeneration.
- Louis de Bernières' novel Señor Vivo and the Coca Lord.
- Brian Keenan's autobiographical account of more than four years as a hostage in Lebanon An Evil Cradling.
- Terry Pratchett's Discworld novels Reaper Man and Witches Abroad.

== Births ==
=== January ===
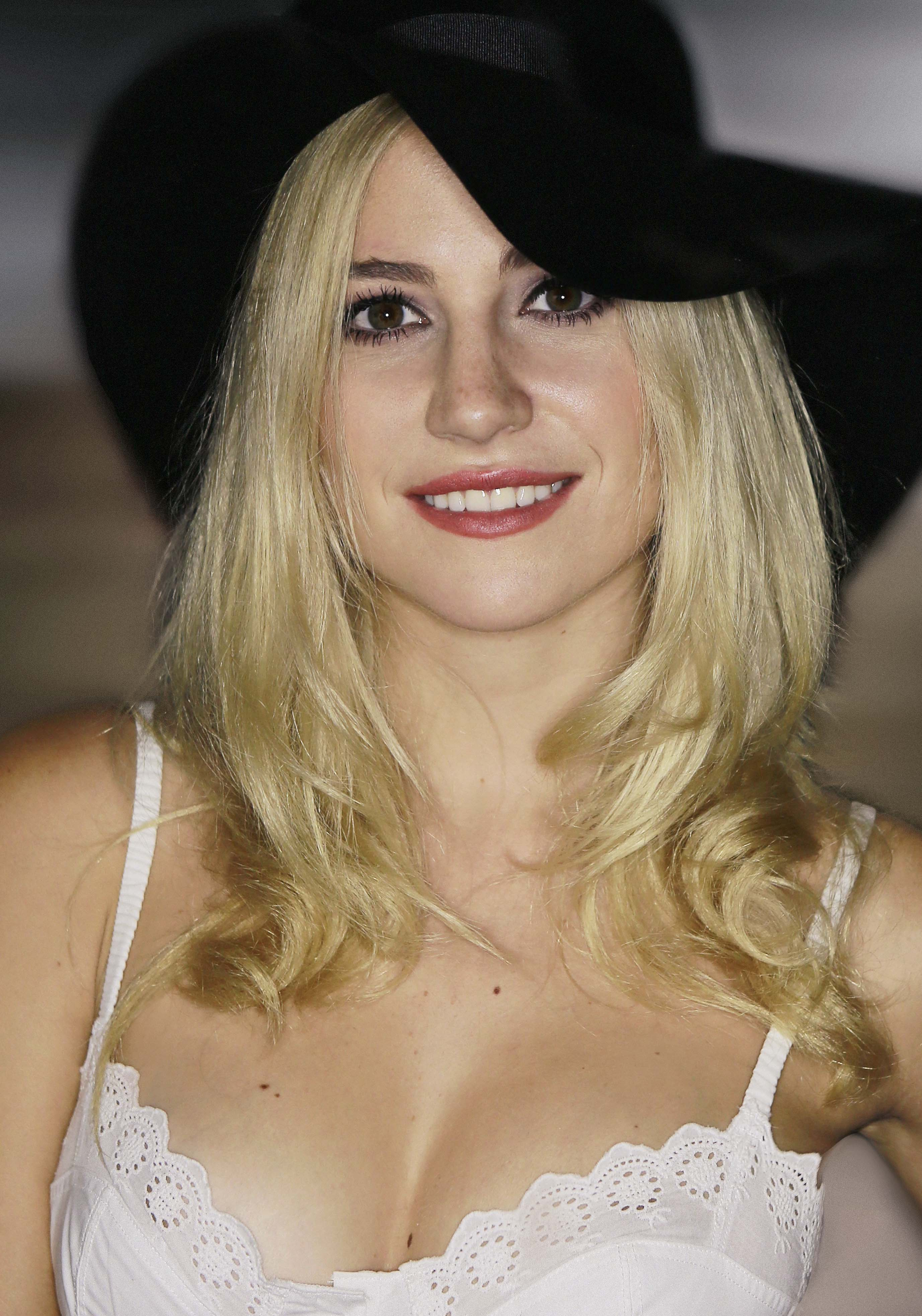
Pixie Lott

- 2 January
  - Ben Hardy, actor
  - Danny Miller, actor
- 12 January – Pixie Lott, singer
- 13 January – Genevieve Gaunt, actress
- 15 January – Danny Addy, professional footballer
- 18 January – Matthew Kane, actor
- 19 January – Tommy Fleetwood, professional golfer
- 20 January
  - Tom Cairney, professional footballer
  - Jolyon Palmer, professional racing driver, motorsport commentator, and columnist
- 21 January – Ben Bowns, professional hockey player
- 22 January – Alex MacDowall, professional racing driver
- 24 January – Nadene Caldwell, professional footballer
- 25 January – Fergus Bell, professional footballer
- 26 January – Nico Mirallegro, actor
- 29 January – Hugh Grosvenor, aristocrat, billionaire and businessman

=== February ===
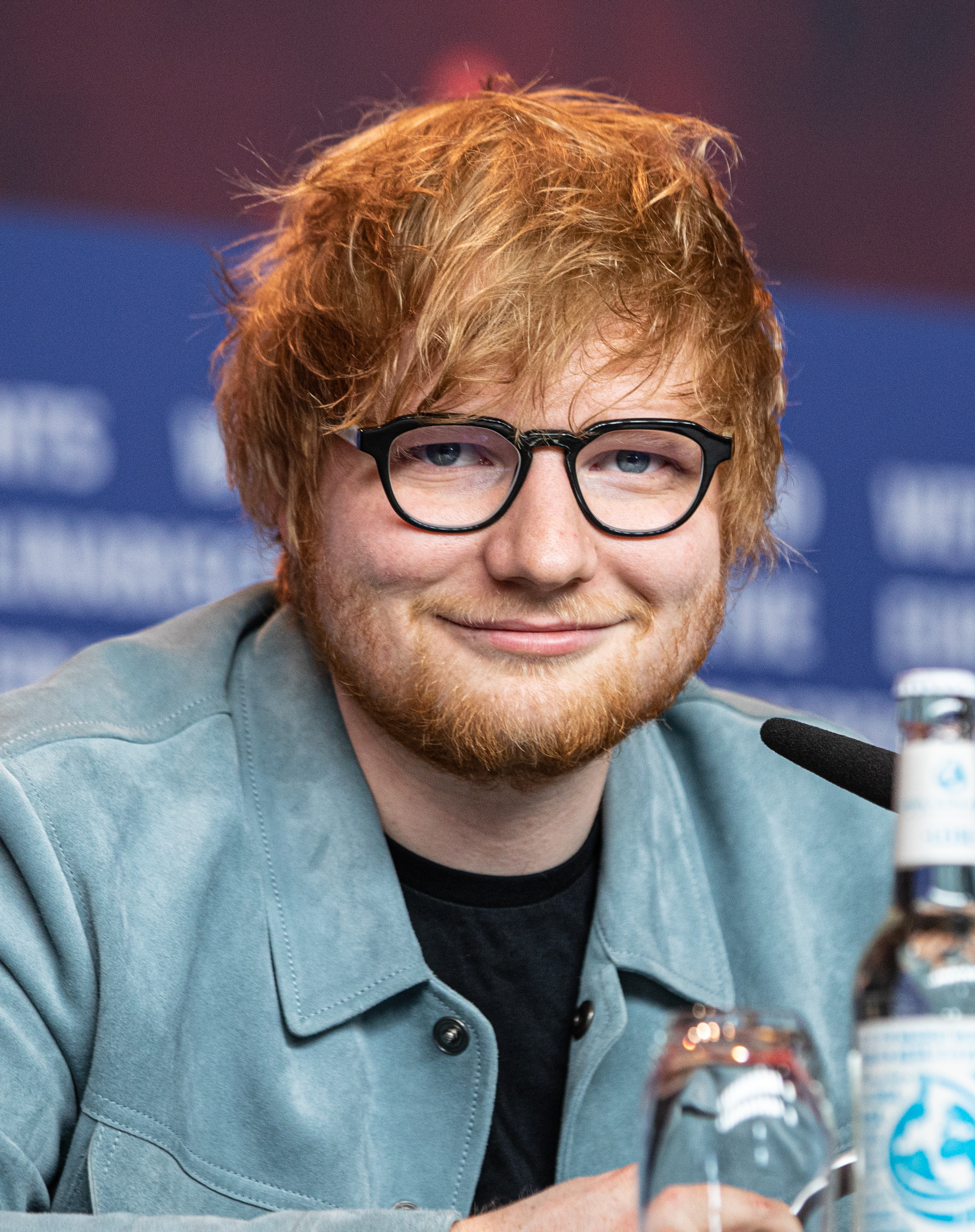
Ed Sheeran

- 2 February
  - Lloyd Ashley, footballer
  - Chris Baker, high jumper
- 7 February – Holly Clyburn, golfer
- 11 February – Georgia May Foote, actress
- 17 February
  - Ed Sheeran, singer/songwriter
  - Bonnie Wright, actress
- 18 February – Henry Surtees, racing driver (died 2009)
- 20 February – Jocelyn Rae, English-Scottish tennis player
- 21 February – Joe Alwyn, actor and model
- 24 February – Hannah Clowes, gymnast
- 26 February
  - Calum Butcher, footballer
  - Toby-Alexander Smith, actor

=== March ===
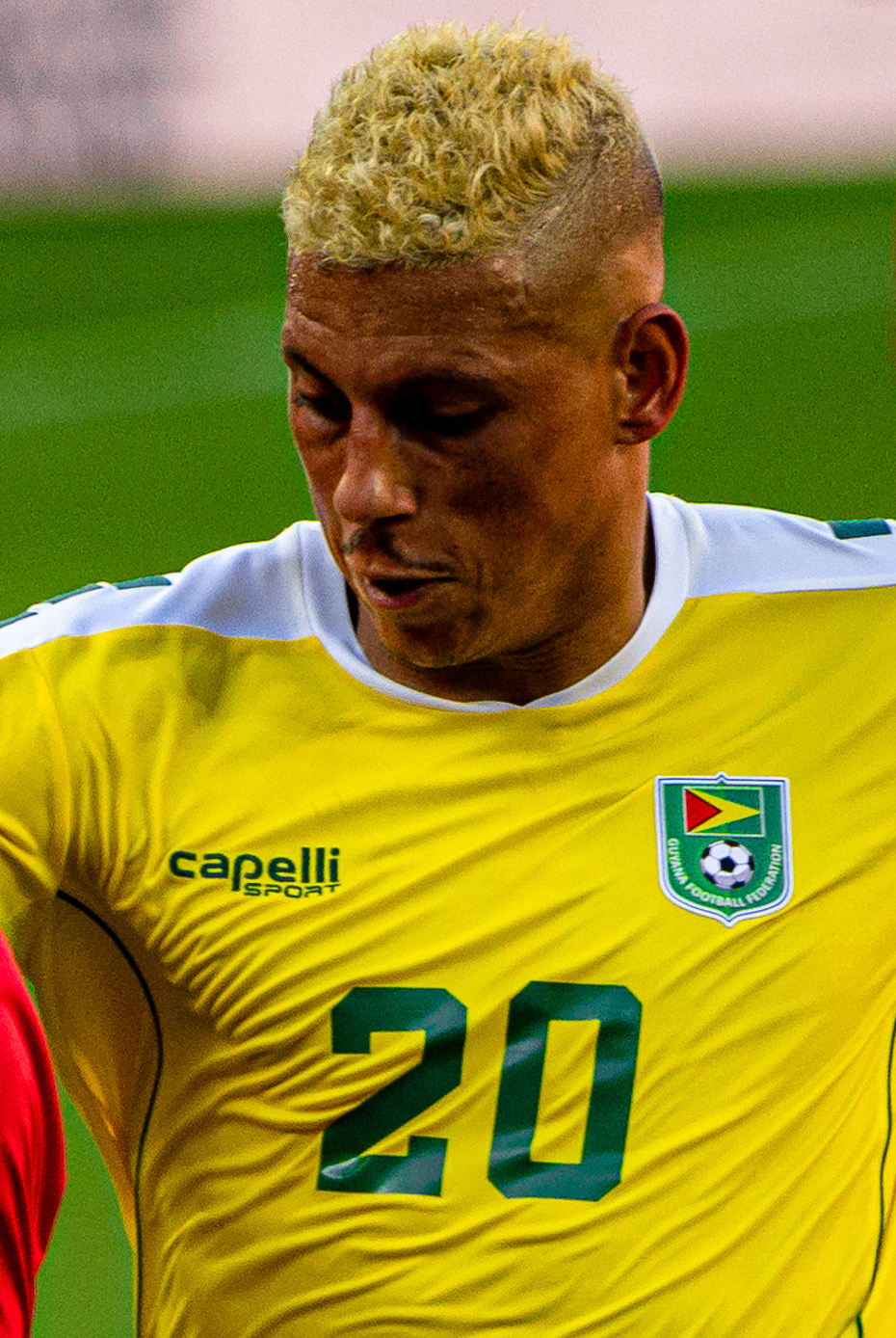
Matthew Briggs

- 6 March – Matthew Briggs, English-born Guyanese professional footballer
- 10 March
  - Kadeena Cox, Paralympic Sprinter and Cyclist
  - Usman Khan, Islamic terrorist and perpetrator of the 2019 London Bridge stabbing (died 2019)
- 11 March
  - Tammy Beaumont, professional cricketer
  - Jack Rodwell, professional footballer
- 14 March – Jake Ball, professional cricketer
- 17 March – Daisy Head, actress
- 22 March – Ashley Eastham, professional footballer
- 26 March – Andrea Atzeni, Italian-born jockey
- 27 March – Chloe Marshall, Model
- March – Elliot Barnes-Worrell, actor

=== April ===
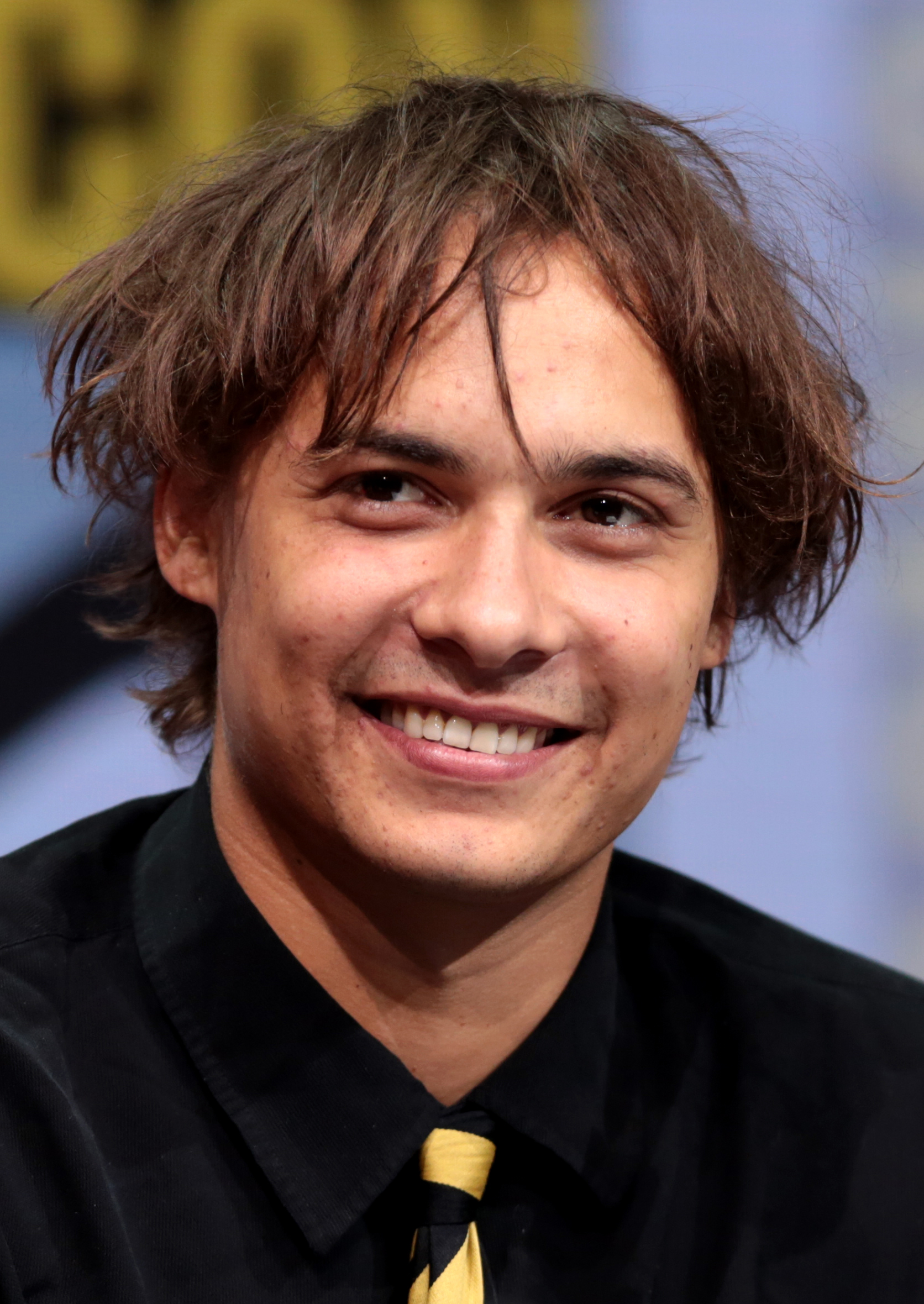
Frank Dillane

- 3 April – Mitch Austin, American Football player
- 5 April – Nathaniel Clyne, footballer
- 7 April – Anne-Marie, singer
- 8 April – Liam Boyce, footballer
- 9 April – Liam Williams, rugby union player
- 19 April – Steve Cook, footballer
- 20 April – Marissa King, gymnast
- 21 April
  - Frank Dillane, actor
  - Max Chilton, racing driver
- 23 April – Nathan Baker, footballer
- 26 April
  - Nathan Buck, cricketer
  - Will Heard, singer/songwriter
- 27 April – Rebecca Ryan, actress
- 29 April – Adam Smith, footballer
- 30 April – Moses Boyd, jazz drummer

=== May ===
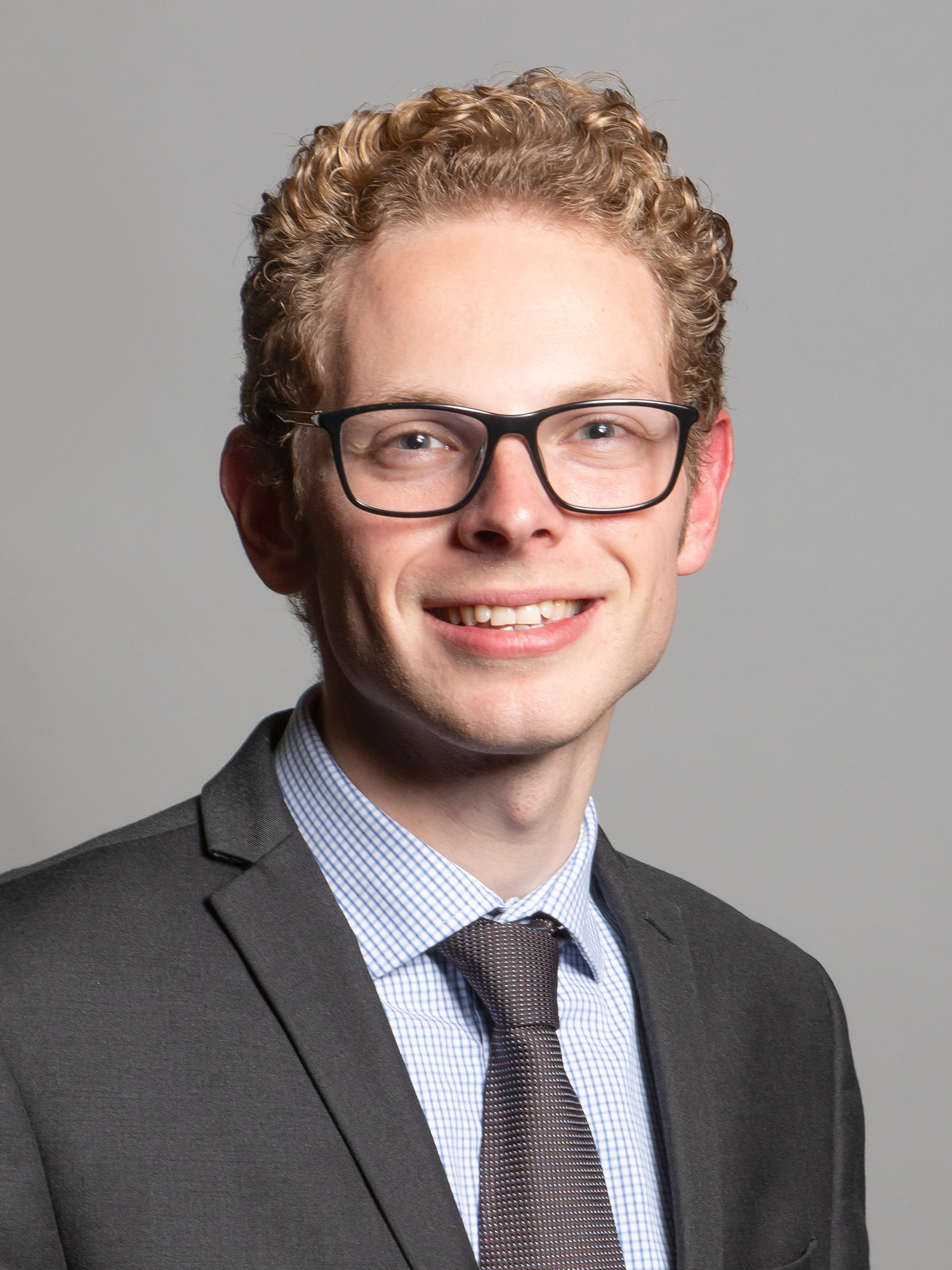
Jack Brereton

- 3 May – Carlo Acutis, England-born Italian Catholic computer programmer, beatified (died 2006 in Italy)
- 6 May
  - Harry Pinero, media personality
  - Siobhan Williams, actress
- 13 May
  - Jen Beattie, footballer
  - Jack Brereton, politician
- 14 May – Chantelle Cameron, boxer
- 17 May – Ashley Bryant, decathlete
- 22 May – Kyle Bartley, footballer
- 26 May – Samuel Ross, fashion designer, creative director and artist
- 30 May
  - Elijah Baker, actor, writer and director
  - Callum Booth, footballer

=== June ===
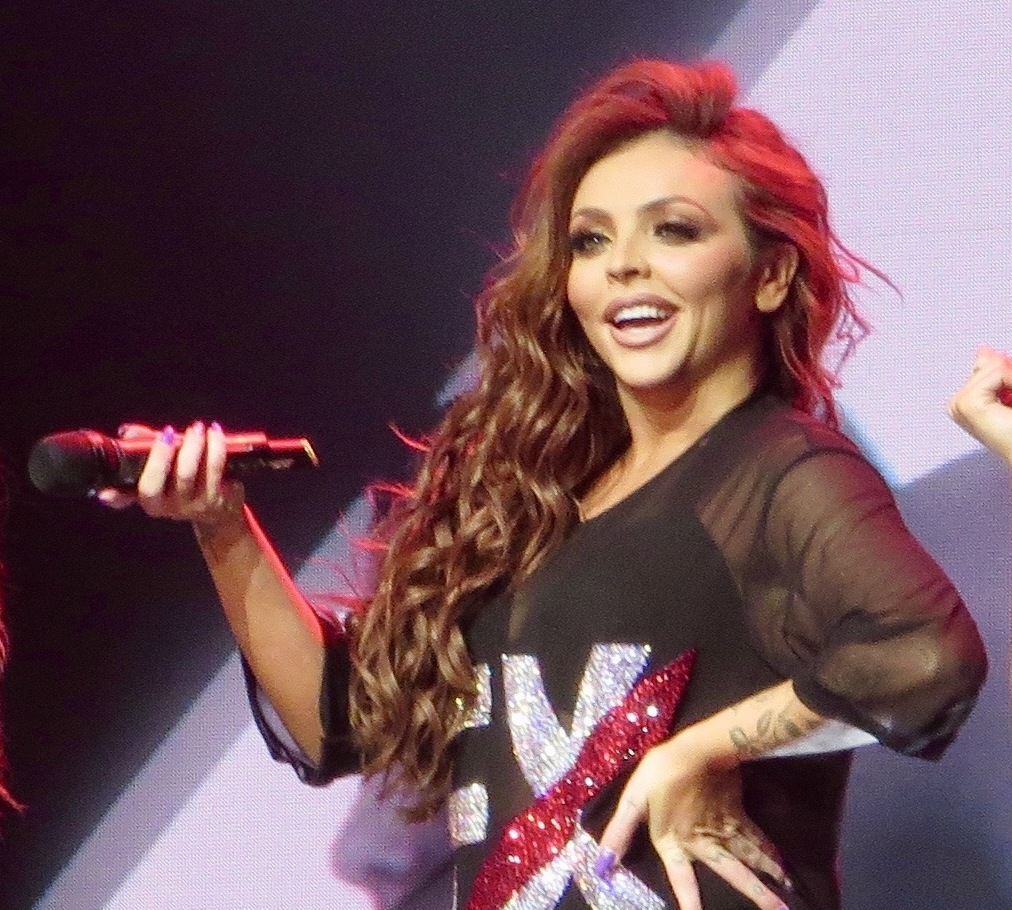
Jesy Nelson

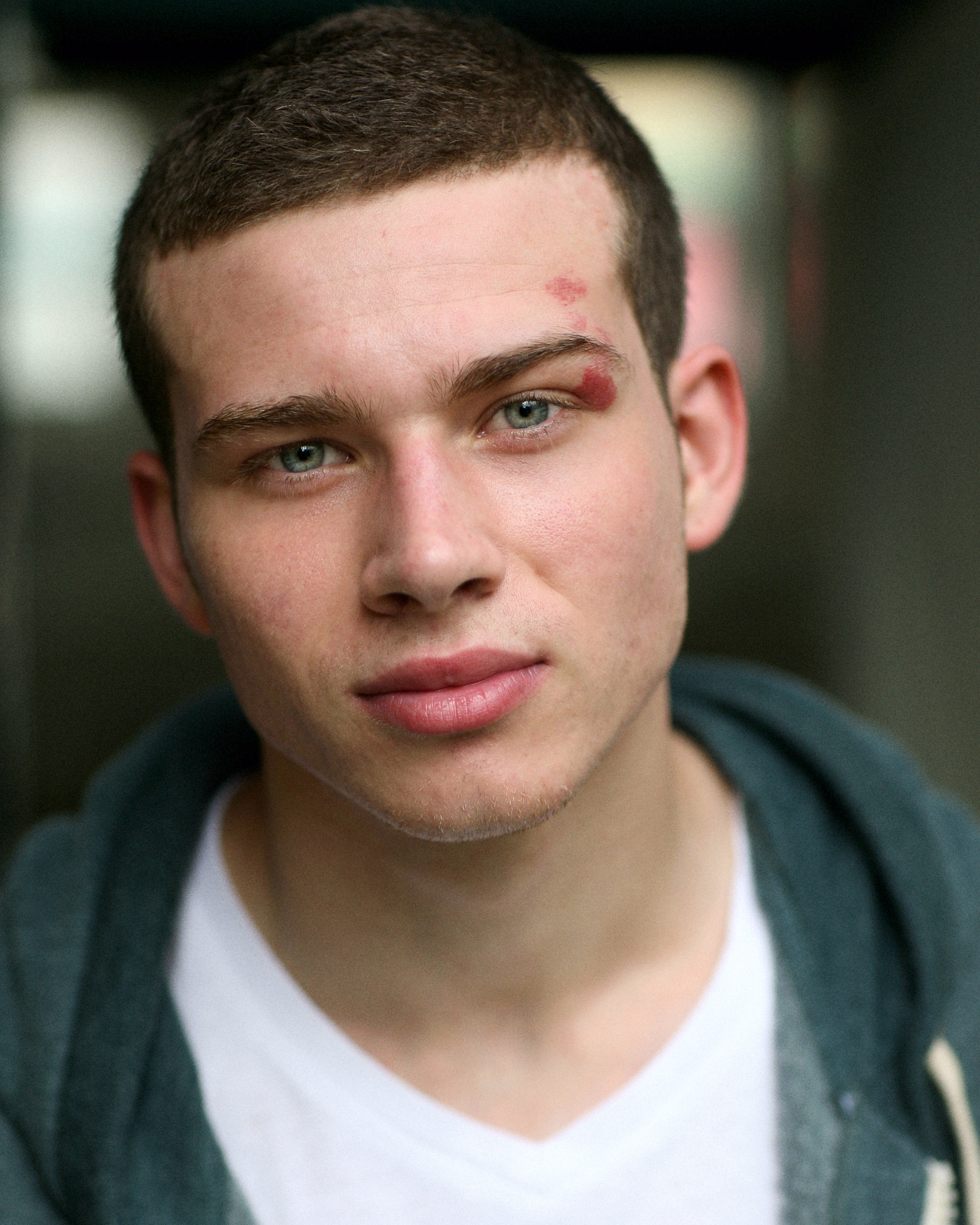
Oliver Stark

- 3 June – Nicky Clark, footballer
- 8 June – Qasim Akhtar, actor
- 11 June – Daniel Howell, YouTuber, radio presenter
- 13 June
  - Lyndon Arthur, boxer
  - Ryan Mason, football player and manager
- 14 June – Jesy Nelson, singer/songwriter
- 15 June – Sam Billings, cricketer
- 16 June – Joe McElderry, singer
- 17 June – Staz Nair, actor and singer
- 21 June
  - Jake Ball, rugby player
  - Georgina Hagen, actress and singer
- 22 June – Katie Jarvis, actress
- 24 June – Yasmin Paige, actress
- 26 June – Josh Charnley, footballer
- 27 June
  - Dan Osborne, television personality
  - Oliver Stark, actor
- 28 June
  - Will Stevens, racing driver
  - George Webster, actor
- 30 June – David Witts, actor

=== July ===
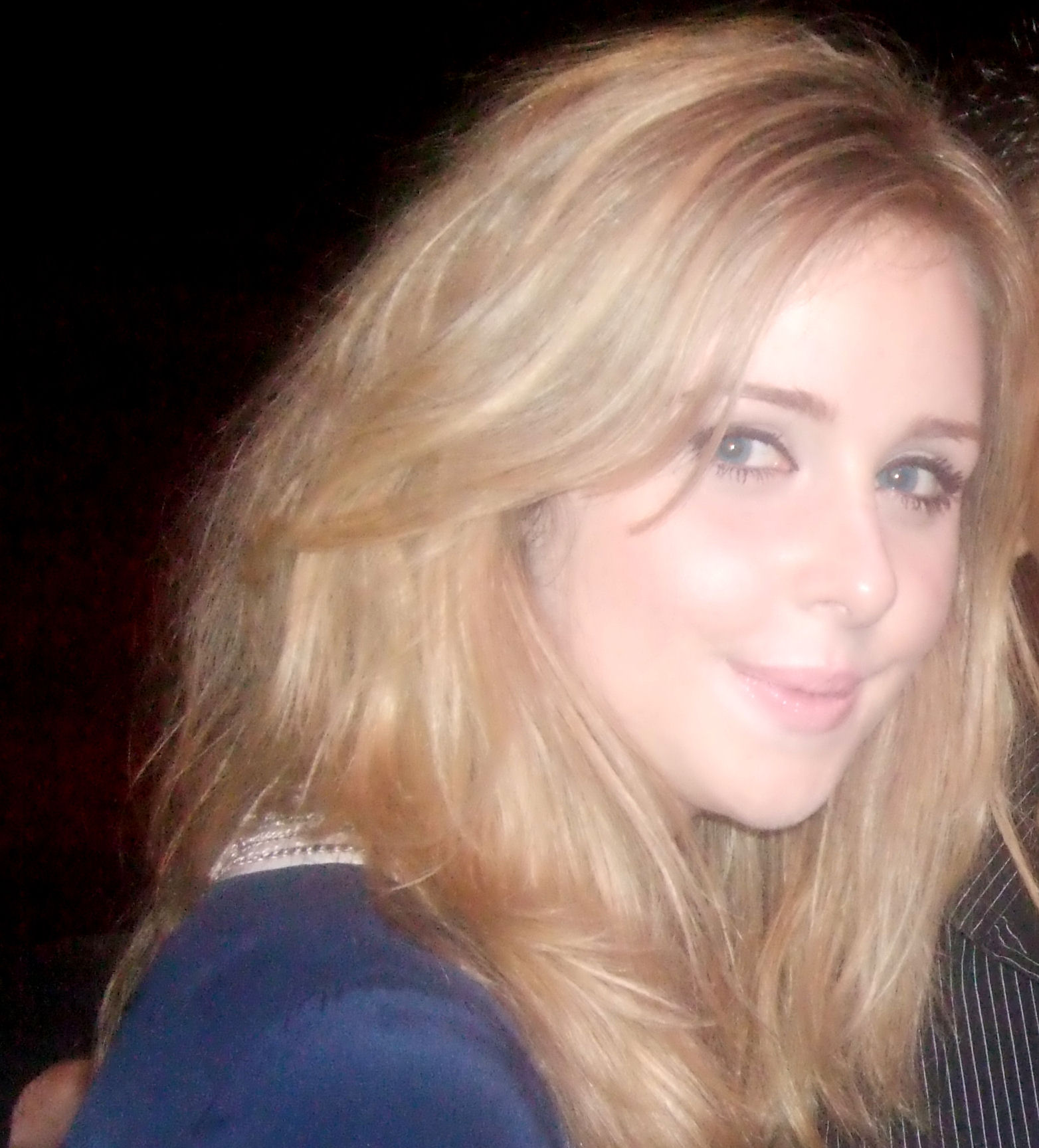
Diana Vickers

- 2 July – Jordan Bowery, professional footballer
- 6 July – Ashley Lloyd, actor and dancer
- 8 July – Jamie Blackley, Manx-born actor
- 13 July – Martin Joseph Ward, professional boxer
- 15 July
  - Nathan Aspinall, professional darts player
  - Lennox Clarke, professional boxer
  - Josh Cook, professional racing driver
- 16 July – Andros Townsend, professional footballer
- 21 July – Blanco White, singer/songwriter
- 24 July – Jacob Banks, Nigerian-born singer/songwriter
- 30 July – Diana Vickers, singer

=== August ===
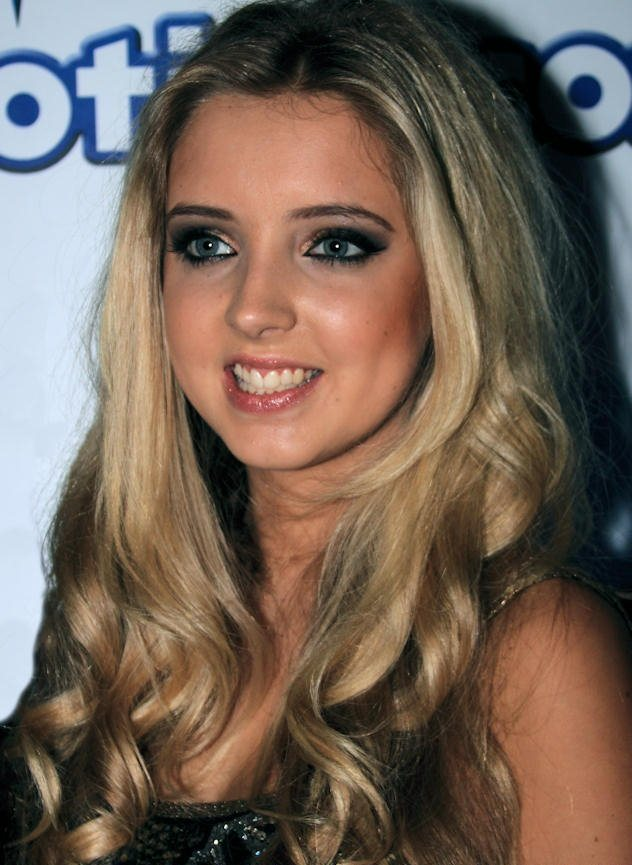
Alice Barlow

- 4 August – Lucinda Dryzek, actress
- 8 August – Tony Clay, actor
- 9 August – Alice Barlow, actress and singer
- 10 August – Michael Dapaah, rapper and comedian
- 15 August – Ellen Gandy, swimmer
- 16 August – Tom Bristow, professional rugby player
- 18 August – George Atkins, professional cyclist
- 22 August – Joe Arundel, professional footballer
- 24 August – Chris Brookes, professional wrestler
- 25 August – Luke Ayling, professional footballer
- 26 August – Tommy Bastow, actor and musician
- 29 August – Ryan J. Brown, screenwriter

=== September ===
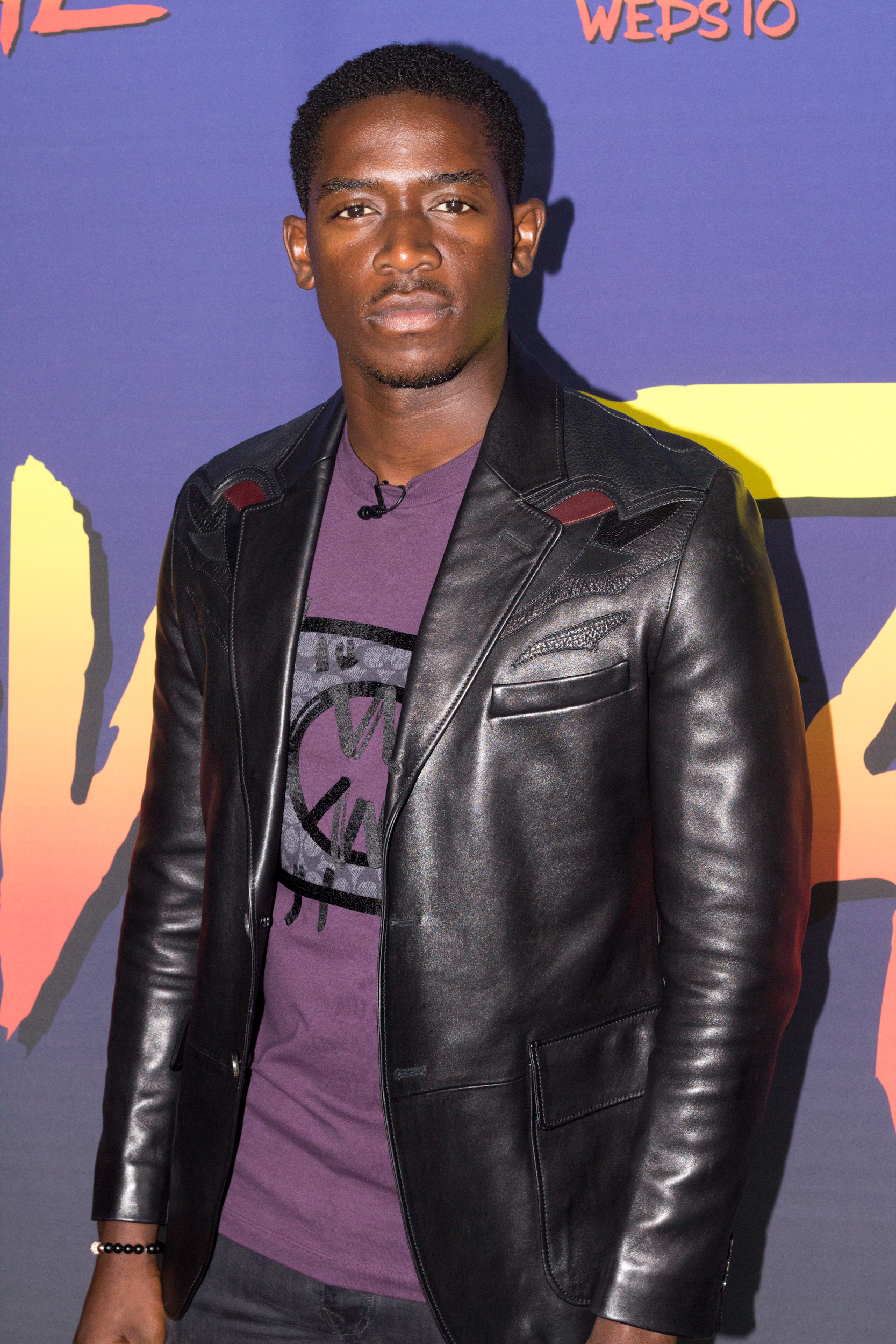
Damson Idris

- 1 September – Rhys Bennett, professional footballer
- 2 September
  - Lucy Armstrong, composer
  - Damson Idris, actor and producer
- 5 September – Skandar Keynes, actor
- 6 September – Drew Cheshire, professional footballer
- 8 September – Joe Sugg, YouTuber
- 11 September – Luke Hubbins, professional footballer
- 13 September – Sonny Bradley, professional footballer
- 20 September – Izzy Christiansen, professional footballer
- 24 September – Owen Farrell, professional rugby player
- 26 September – Charlotte Spencer, actress

=== October ===
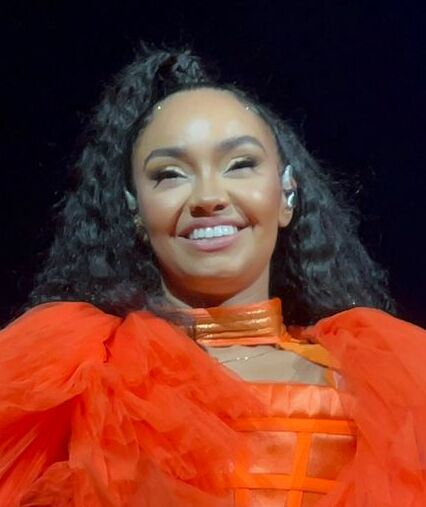
Leigh-Anne Pinnock

- 1 October – Gus Kenworthy, British-born, American Olympic freestyle skier, actor, and YouTuber
- 2 October – Gordon Reid, Scottish wheelchair tennis player
- 4 October – Leigh-Anne Pinnock, singer/songwriter
- 9 October – Danny Ansell, professional footballer
- 10 October – Kate Avery, professional long-distance runner
- 14 October
  - Andrew Butchart, Olympic runner
  - Shona McGarty, actress
- 25 October – Omar Beckles, professional footballer
- 28 October – Lucy Bronze, professional footballer
- 29 October
  - Grant Hall, professional footballer
  - Toby Tarrant, radio broadcaster

=== November ===
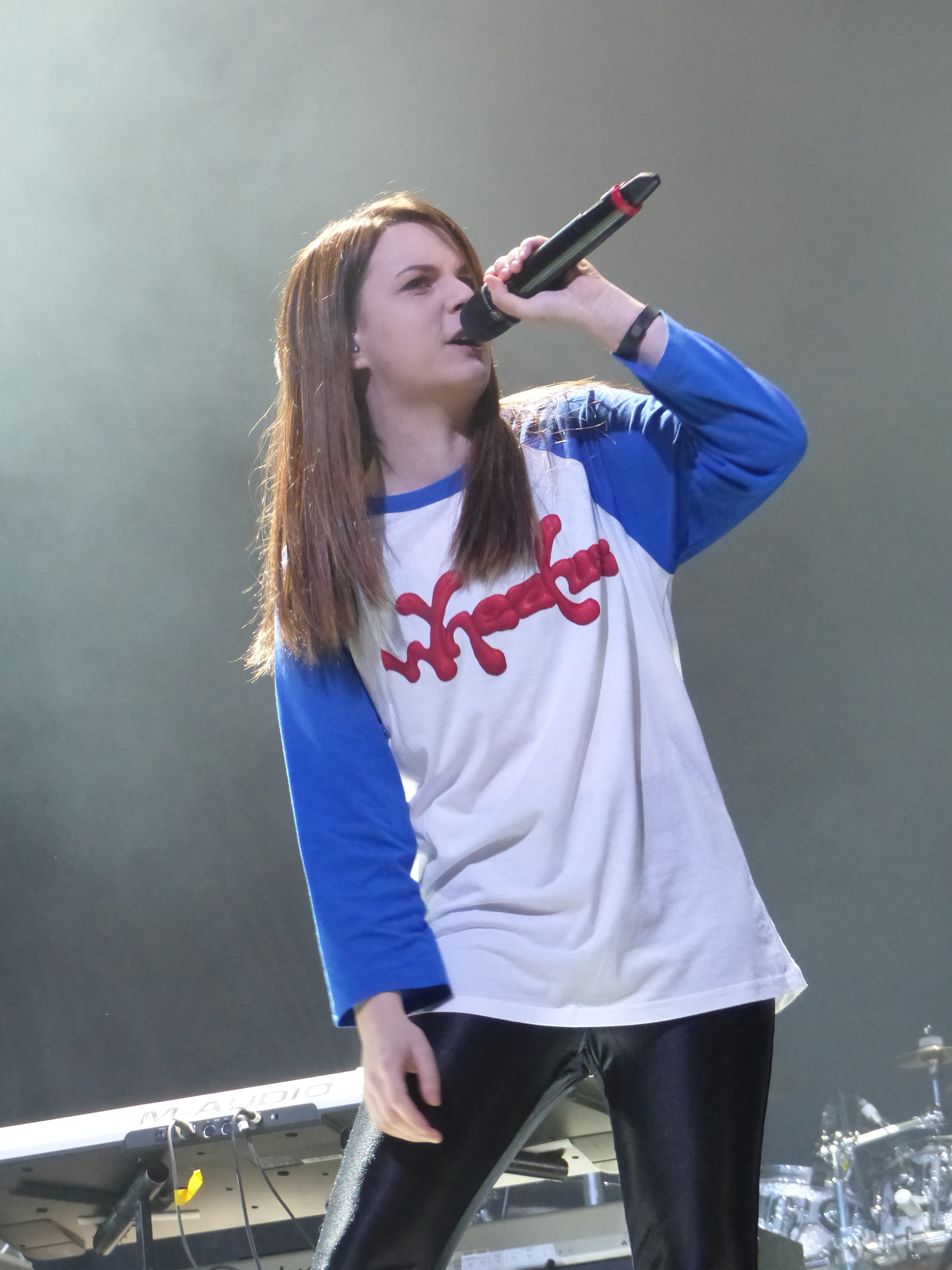
Emma Blackery

- 1 November – Rachael Letsche, trampoline gymnast
- 2 November – Holly Bradshaw, Olympic pole vaulter
- 4 November – Michael Jacobs, professional footballer
- 6 November – George Bowerman, professional footballer
- 8 November
  - Elinor Crawley, actress
  - Daniel Middleton, YouTuber
- 11 November – Emma Blackery, singer/songwriter, YouTube Vlogger, record producer, and author
- 21 November
  - Nathan Cameron, professional footballer
  - Lewis Dunk, professional footballer
- 22 November – Kadeen Corbin, professional netball player
- 28 November – Scott Allan, professional footballer
- 30 November – Ryan Bowman, professional footballer

=== December ===
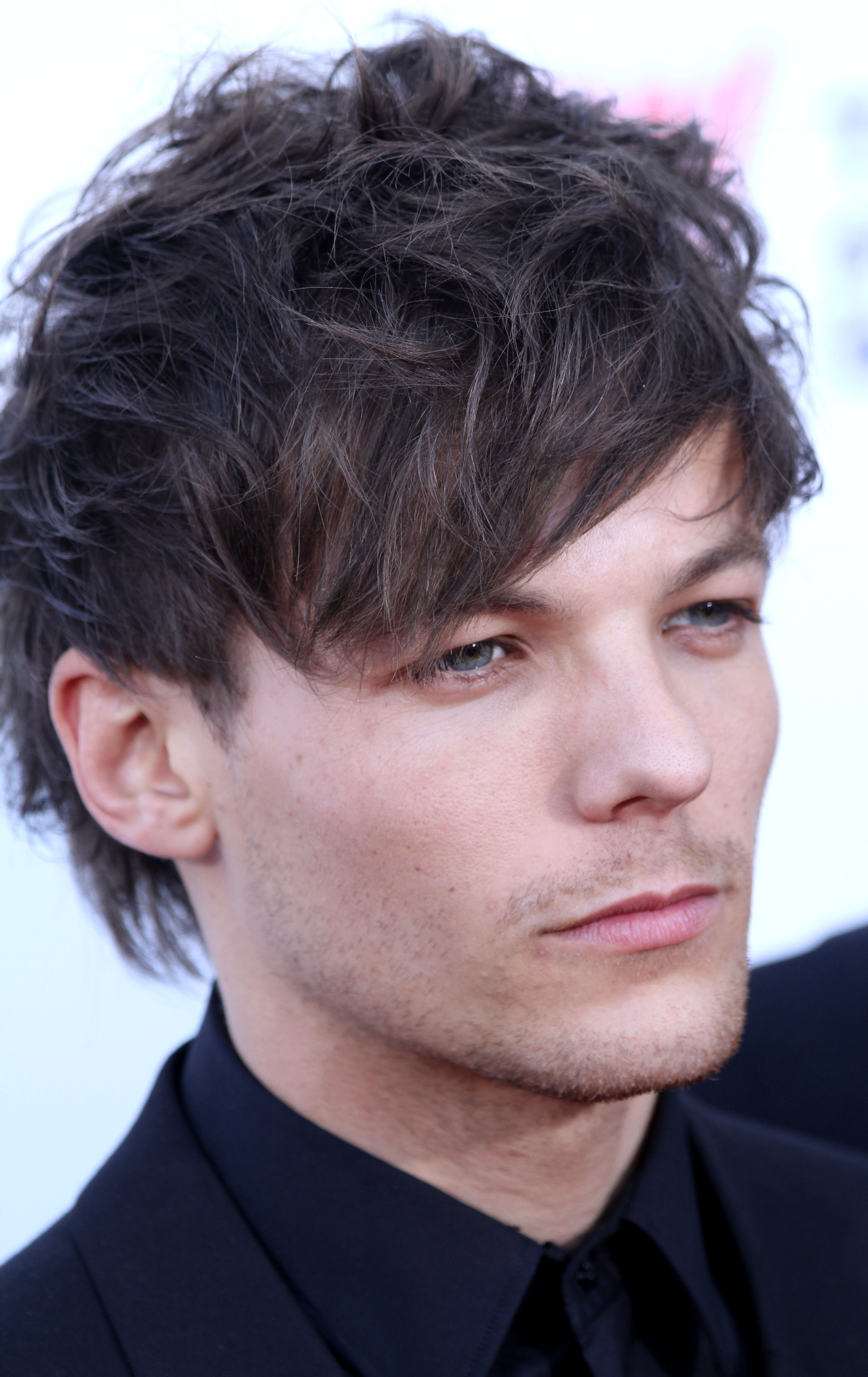
Louis Tomlinson

- 4 December – Aiden Grimshaw, singer
- 6 December – Rachel Daly, footballer
- 11 December – Rebecca Chin, Paralympic rower
- 15 December – Joe Collister, professional footballer
- 16 December – Charlie Clare, professional rugby player
- 18 December – Marcus Butler, model and YouTuber
- 19 December – Declan Galbraith, singer
- 24 December – Louis Tomlinson, singer-songwriter
- 30 December – Eddie Battye, professional footballer

=== Full date unknown ===
- Sheila Atim, Ugandan-born actress, singer, composer, and playwright

== Deaths ==
=== January ===
- 2 January – Sydney Caine, educator and economist (born 1902)
- 3 January – Doris Zinkeisen, theatrical designer (born 1898)
- 8 January
  - Steve Clark, guitarist (Def Leppard) (born 1960)
  - Henry Rainsford Hulme, nuclear physicist (born 1908)
- 10 January – Bob Wallis, jazz musician (born 1934)
- 11 January
  - Charles Mozley, artist (born 1914)
  - Sir Alec Rose, sailor (born 1908)
- 14 January
  - Duncan Black, economist (born 1908)
  - Donald Coleman, politician (born 1925)
- 15 January – Bob Stirling, rugby union player (born 1919)
- 16 January – Nicholas Mansergh, historian (born 1910)
- 20 January – Alfred Wainwright, author and illustrator (born 1907)
- 21 January – John Bicknell Auden, geologist (born 1903)
- 23 January – Herbert Fröhlich, physicist (born 1905, German Empire)
- 29 January – Joan Gilbert, broadcaster (born 1906)
- 30 January – Rhys Lloyd, Baron Lloyd of Kilgerran, politician (born 1907)

=== February ===
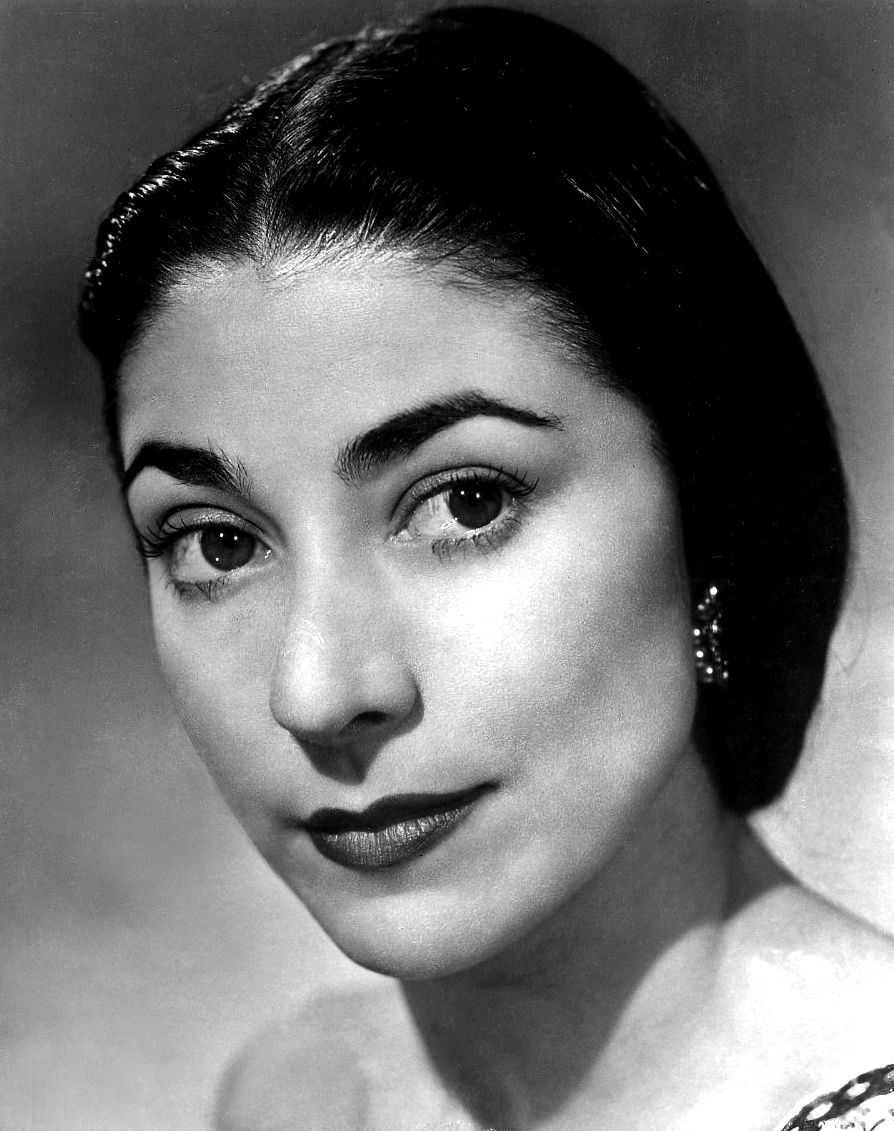
Margot Fonteyn

- 5 February – Sir Lawrence Gowing, artist (born 1918)
- 8 February
  - Daphne Jackson, nuclear physicist (born 1936)
  - Evan Luard, politician (born 1926)
- 13 February – Ron Pickering, sports commentator (born 1930)
- 17 February – Sir Francis Pearson, politician and colonial administrator (born 1911)
- 18 February – Fulke Walwyn, jockey (born 1910)
- 20 February – Sir George Clark, 3rd Baronet, Northern Irish politician (born 1914)
- 21 February
  - Dorothy Auchterlonie, poet and academic (born 1915)
  - Dame Margot Fonteyn, ballet dancer (born 1919)
- 22 February – Eric Hosking, photographer (born 1909)
- 24 February – Stewart Morris, Olympic sailor (born 1909)

=== March ===
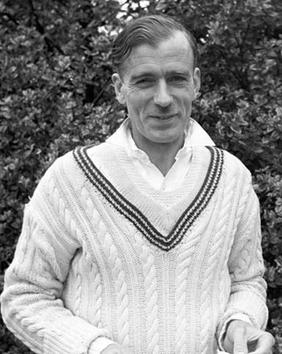
Jack Meyer

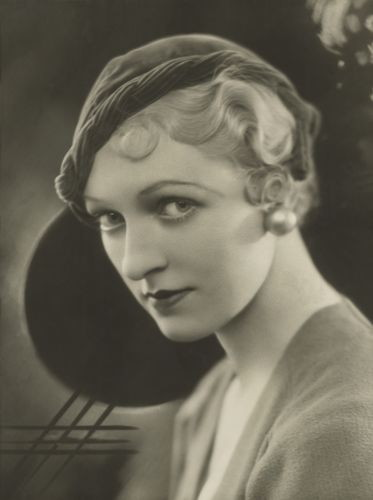
Sunday Wilshin

- 1 March – Katherine Blake, actress (born 1921 or 1923)
- 2 March – Mary Howard, novelist (born 1907)
- 3 March – William Penney, Baron Penney, mathematician (born 1909)
- 4 March
  - Michael Hardwick, author (born 1924)
  - Kenneth Lindsay, politician (born 1897)
- 5 March
  - Sir Brian Batsford, politician (born 1910)
  - Ian McLellan Hunter, screenwriter (born 1915)
- 7 March – John Harris, novelist (born 1916)
- 9 March – Jack Meyer, cricketer and educationalist (born 1905)
- 10 March – Mildred Eldridge, artist (born 1909)
- 12 March – R. H. C. Davis, historian (born 1918)
- 13 March – Donald Kaberry, Baron Kaberry of Adel, politician (injuries received in Carlton Club bombing) (born 1907)
- 14 March – Margery Sharp, novelist and playwright (born 1905)
- 15 March – Robin Hill, biochemist, discoverer of the Hill reaction (born 1899)
- 16 March – Rowland Baring, 3rd Earl of Cromer, central banker and diplomat (born 1918)
- 17 March – Carl Aarvold, lawyer (born 1907)
- 19 March – Sunday Wilshin, actress and radio presenter (born 1905)
- 20 March – David Marshall Lang, historian (born 1924)
- 24 March – Maudie Edwards, actress and singer (born 1906)
- 27 March
  - Ralph Bates, actor (born 1940)
  - Alfredo Campoli, violinist (born 1906, Italy)
- 31 March – A. W. Lawrence, archaeologist (born 1900)

=== April ===
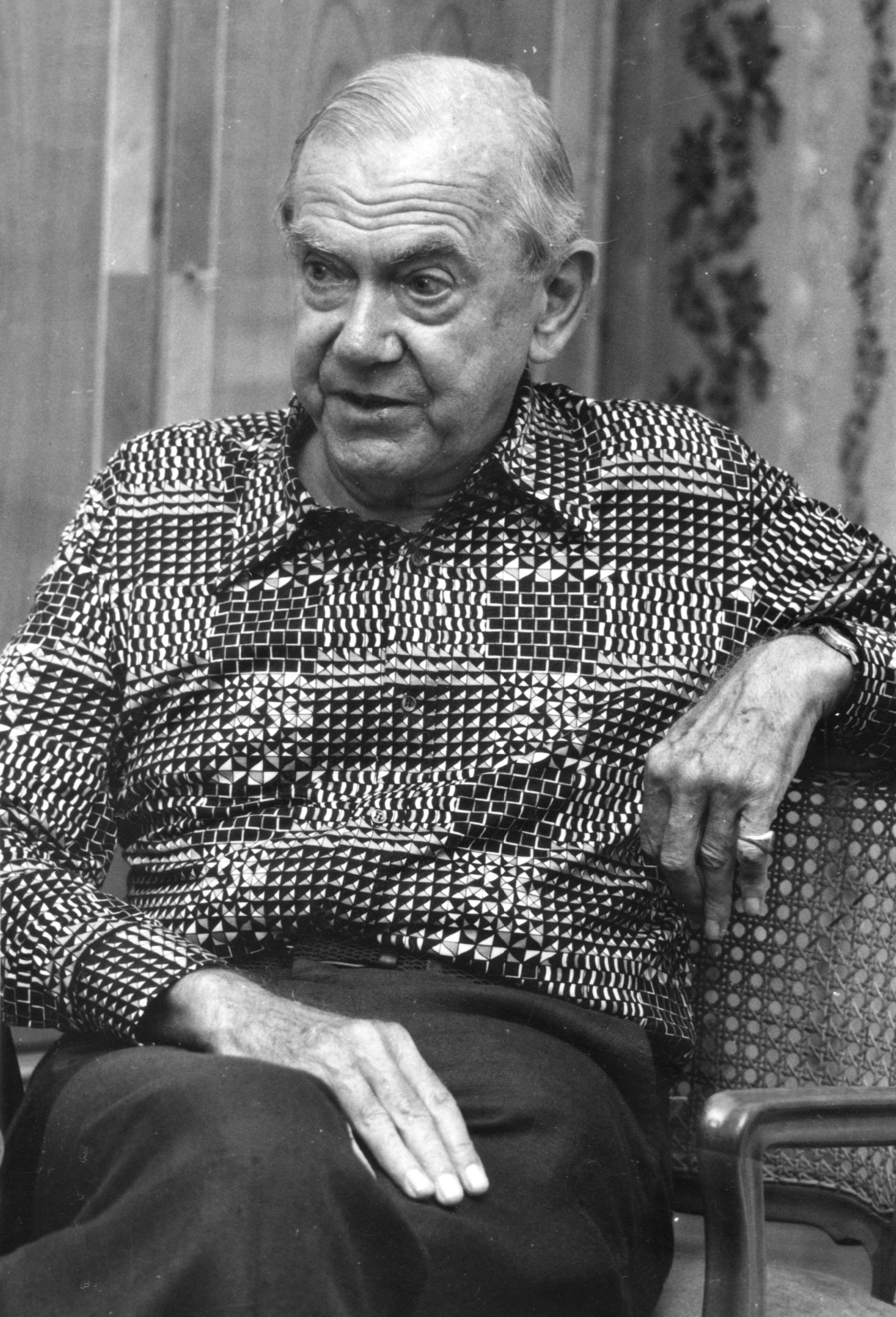
Graham Greene

- 3 April
  - Graham Greene, author (born 1904); died in Switzerland
  - Sir Alan Stewart Orr, barrister (born 1911)
- 5 April
  - Gerald Blake, television director (born 1928)
  - Eve Garnett, writer and illustrator (born 1900)
  - William Sidney, 1st Viscount De L'Isle, Army officer, politician and VC recipient (born 1909)
- 11 April – Bernard Taylor, Baron Taylor of Mansfield, politician (born 1895)
- 16 April – David Lean, film director and producer (born 1908)
- 17 April – Michael Pertwee, screenwriter (born 1916)
- 18 April
  - Martin Hannett, record producer (born 1948)
  - Sir Austin Bradford Hill, epidemiologist and statistician, creator of the Bradford Hill criteria (born 1897)
- 19 April – Judy Gunn, actress (born 1915)
- 20 April – Steve Marriott, singer, musician (Small Faces and Humble Pie) (born 1947); house fire
- 22 April – Jack Kid Berg, boxer (born 1909)
- 26 April – Henry Lipson, physicist (born 1910)
- 28 April – Stan Turner, English footballer (born 1926)

=== May ===
- 1 May – Charles Sutherland Elton, zoologist and animal ecologist (born 1900)
- 2 May – Susan Fassbender, singer (born 1959); suicide
- 4 May – Bernie Winters, actor and comedian (Mike and Bernie Winters) (born 1930)
- 6 May – Wilfred Hyde-White, actor (born 1903)
- 8 May – Ronnie Brody, actor (born 1918)
- 14 May – Joy Batchelor, animator, screenwriter, director and producer (born 1914)
- 15 May – Ronald Lacey, actor (born 1935)
- 17 May
  - G. Evelyn Hutchinson, economist (born 1903)
  - Harry Rée, academic (born 1914)
- 18 May – Muriel Box, film director and screenwriter (born 1905)
- 22 May – Stan Mortensen, footballer (born 1921)
- 25 May – Lorne MacLaine Campbell, Army brigadier-general (born 1902)
- 26 May – Wilfred Roberts, politician (born 1900)
- 27 May – Eric Heffer, politician (born 1922)
- 29 May – Henry Walston, Baron Walston, politician (born 1912)
- 31 May
  - Robert Schlapp, physicist (born 1899)
  - Angus Wilson, novelist and short story writer (born 1913)

=== June ===
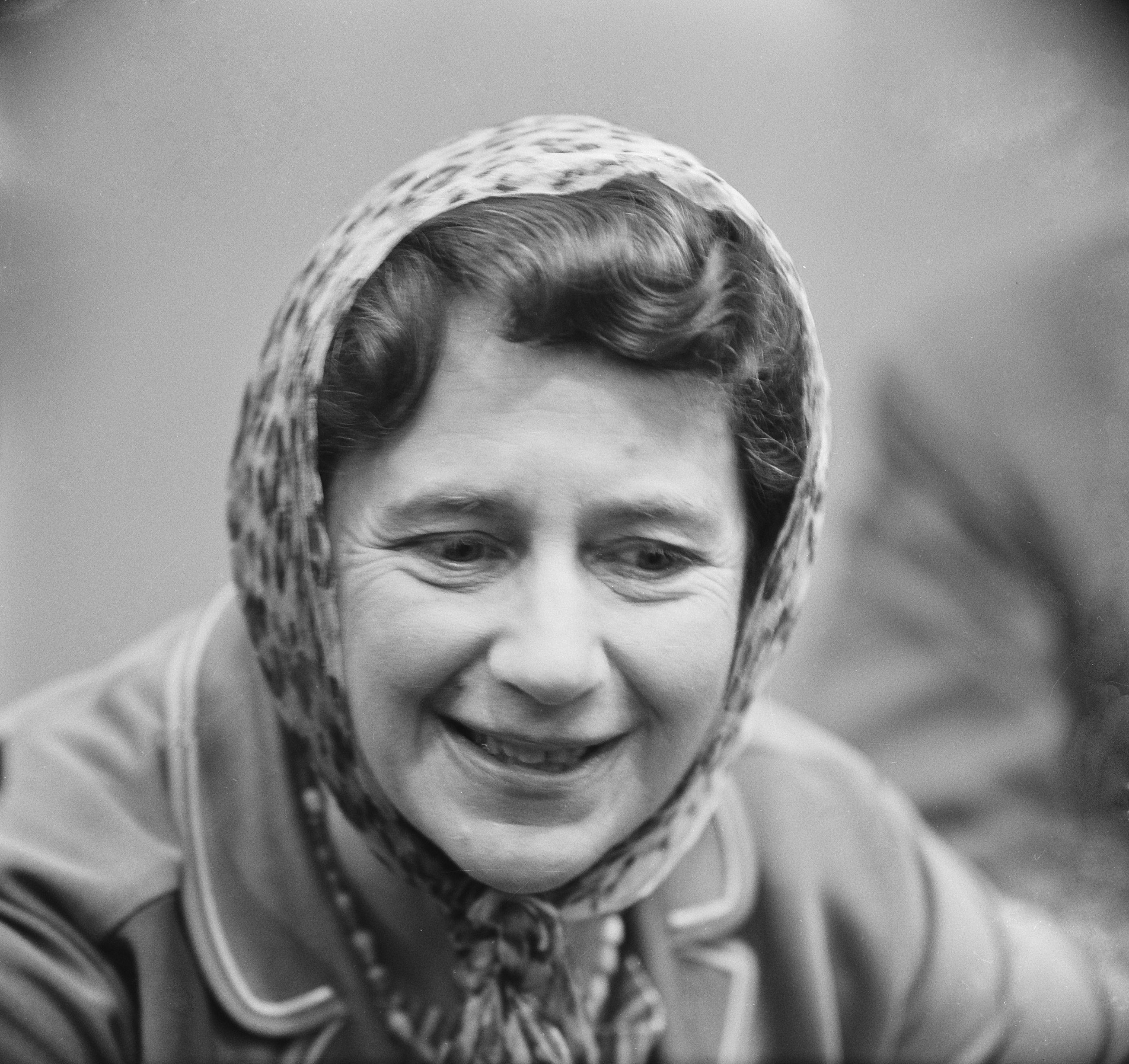
Peggy Ashcroft

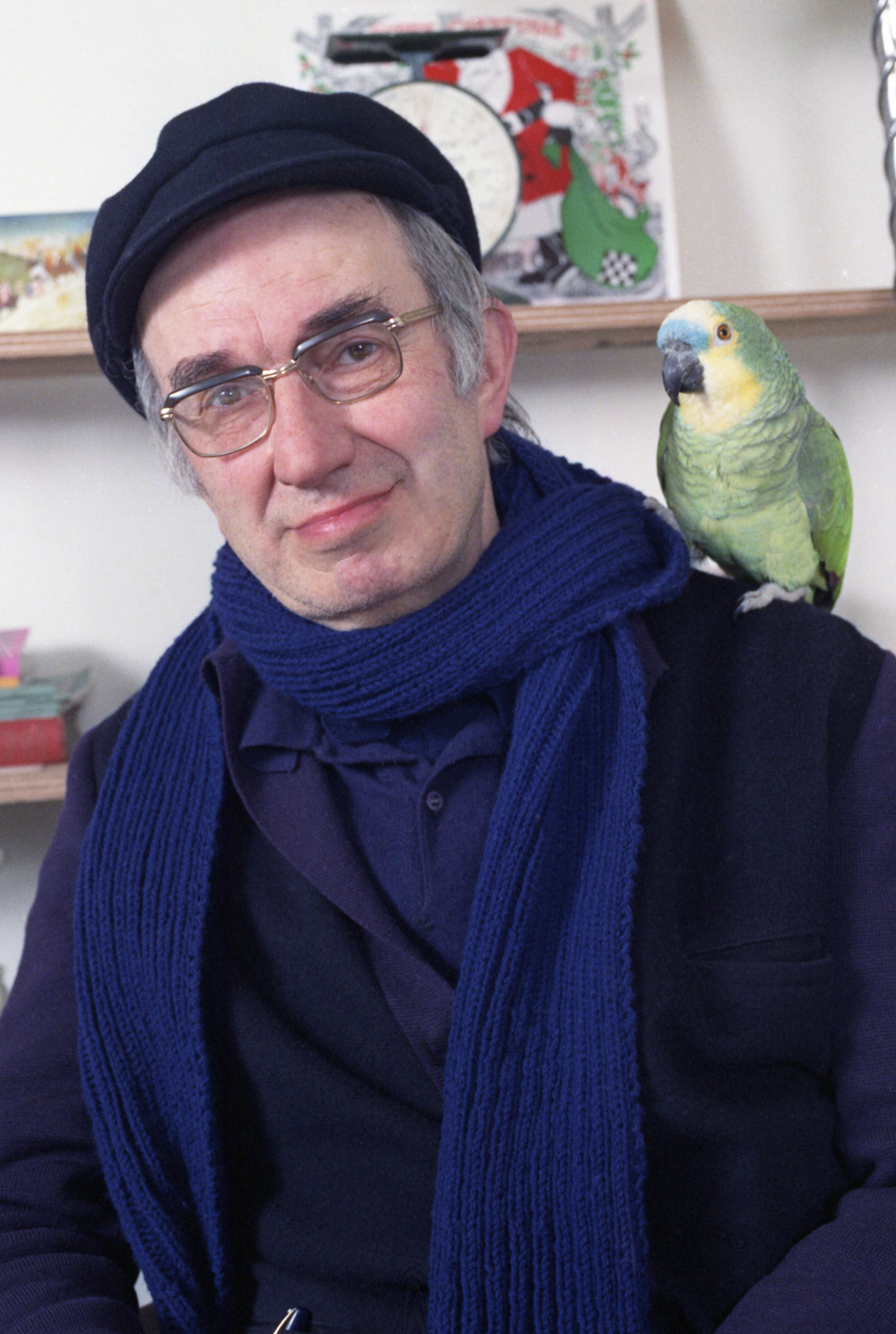
Bernard Miles, Baron Miles

- 5 June – Evelyn Boucher, actress (born 1902)
- 8 June – Bertice Reading, actress and singer (born 1933, United States)
- 11 June
  - John Vallier, pianist (born 1920)
  - Michael Wall, playwright (born 1946)
- 12 June – Alexander Baring, 6th Baron Ashburton, businessman and politician (born 1898)
- 14 June
  - Dame Peggy Ashcroft, actress (born 1907)
  - Bernard Miles, Baron Miles, actor and director (born 1907)
- 15 June – Arthur Lewis, economist, Nobel Prize laureate (born 1915)
- 16 June – Vicki Brown, singer (born 1940)
- 18 June
  - Ronald Allen, actor (born 1930)
  - Bill Douglas, film director (born 1934)
- 20 June
  - Gerald Priestland, broadcaster (born 1927)
  - Sir Isaac Wolfson, 1st Baronet, businessman and philanthropist (born 1897)
- 21 June – Ivor Salter, actor (born 1925)
- 23 June – Cyril Aldred, historian (born 1914)
- 24 June – Sir James Fawcett, barrister and maternal grandfather of Boris Johnson (born 1913)
- 25 June – Colin Atkinson, cricketer and schoolmaster (born 1931)
- 27 June – George MacLeod, soldier and Presbyterian minister (born 1895)
- 30 June – Pamela Stanley, actress (born 1909)

=== July ===
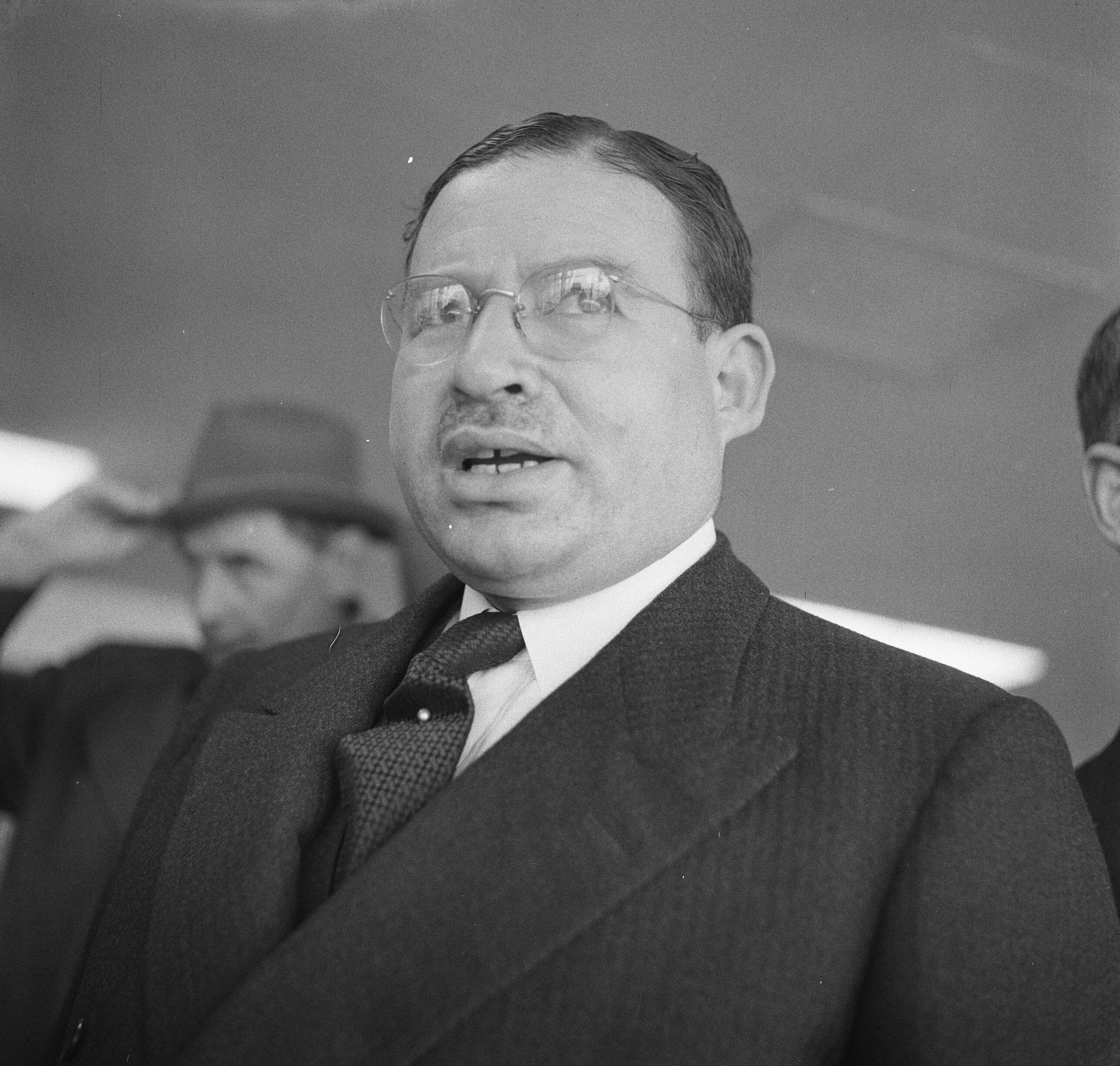
Bernard Waley-Cohen

- 2 July
  - Don Houghton, television screenwriter and producer (born 1930)
  - David Howarth, author and boat builder (born 1912)
- 3 July – Sir Bernard Waley-Cohen, businessman and Lord Mayor of London (1960–1961) (born 1914)
- 6 July – Thorley Walters, character actor (born 1913)
- 8 July – Geoff Love, composer (born 1917)
- 9 July – Frank Carr, sailor and founder of the Maritime Trust (born 1903)
- 17 July – Harold Butler, English cricketer (born 1913)
- 21 July
  - Jasmine Bligh, television presenter (born 1913)
  - Paul Warwick, racing driver (born 1969); killed while racing
- 23 July – Peter Kane, flyweight boxer (born 1918)
- 24 July – Freddie Brown, English cricketer (born 1910)
- 27 July – Martin Attlee, 2nd Earl Attlee, politician and son of Clement Attlee (born 1927)
- 30 July
  - Tom Bridger, racing driver (born 1934)
  - Arthur Rook, dermatologist (born 1918)

=== August ===
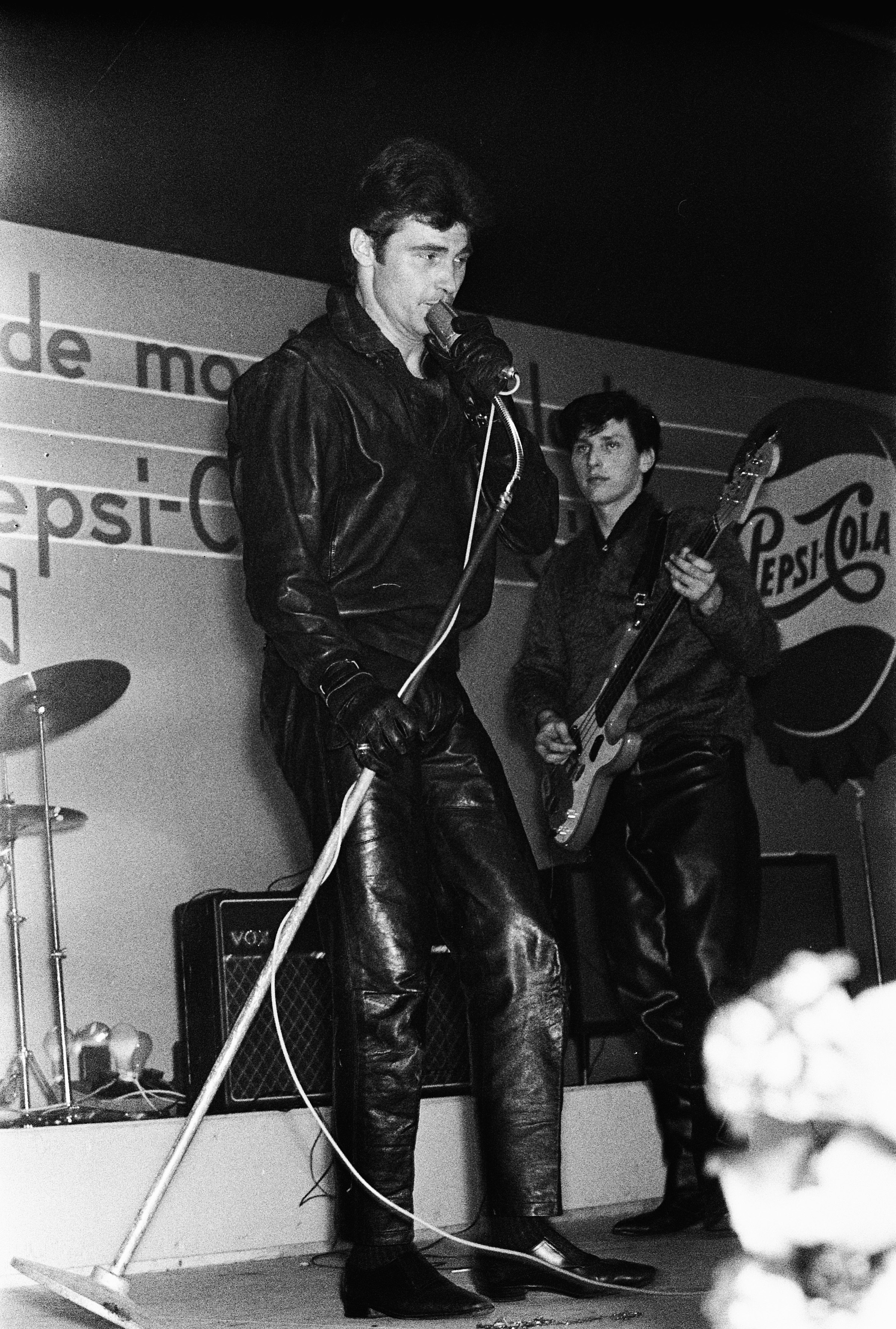
Vince Taylor

- 6 August
  - Arthur Pentelow, actor (born 1924)
  - Max Rostal, violinist (born 1905, Austria-Hungary)
- 10 August – Jessie Robins, actress (born 1905)
- 11 August – Alan Spenner, bass player (born 1948)
- 12 August – Edward George Bowen, CBE, physicist (born 1911)
- 13 August – John Sommerfield, writer and left-wing activist (born 1908)
- 17 August – Lorna Hill, children's author (born 1902)
- 18 August – David Gale, actor (born 1936)
- 19 August – Xan Fielding, author, journalist and traveller (born 1918)
- 23 August – Innes Lloyd, television producer (born 1925)
- 26 August – John Petts, artist (born 1914)
- 28 August – Vince Taylor, rock singer (born 1939)
- 29 August – Dallas Adams, actor (born 1947)
- 30 August
  - Cyril Knowles, English footballer (born 1944)
  - Alan Wheatley, actor (born 1907)
- 31 August – Gerry Davis, television scriptwriter (born 1930)

=== September ===
- 8 September – Gordon Gunson, footballer (born 1904)
- 12 September – Sir Ewan Forbes, 11th Baronet, nobleman, doctor and farmer (born 1912)
- 13 September – Robert Irving, orchestral conductor (born 1913)
- 16 September
  - Ernest Davies, politician and journalist (born 1902)
  - Carol White, actress (born 1943)
- 17 September – John Tocher, trade unionist and communist activist (born 1925)
- 18 September – Harry Sandbach, academic (born 1903)
- 19 September – Sir Theodore McEvoy, RAF air marshal (born 1904)
- 21 September – Gordon Bashford, car designer (born 1916)
- 24 September – Peter Bellamy, singer (born 1944); suicide
- 27 September
  - Roy Fuller, poet (born 1912)
  - Joe Hulme, footballer and cricketer (born 1904)
- 28 September – Ellic Howe, author (born 1910)

=== October ===
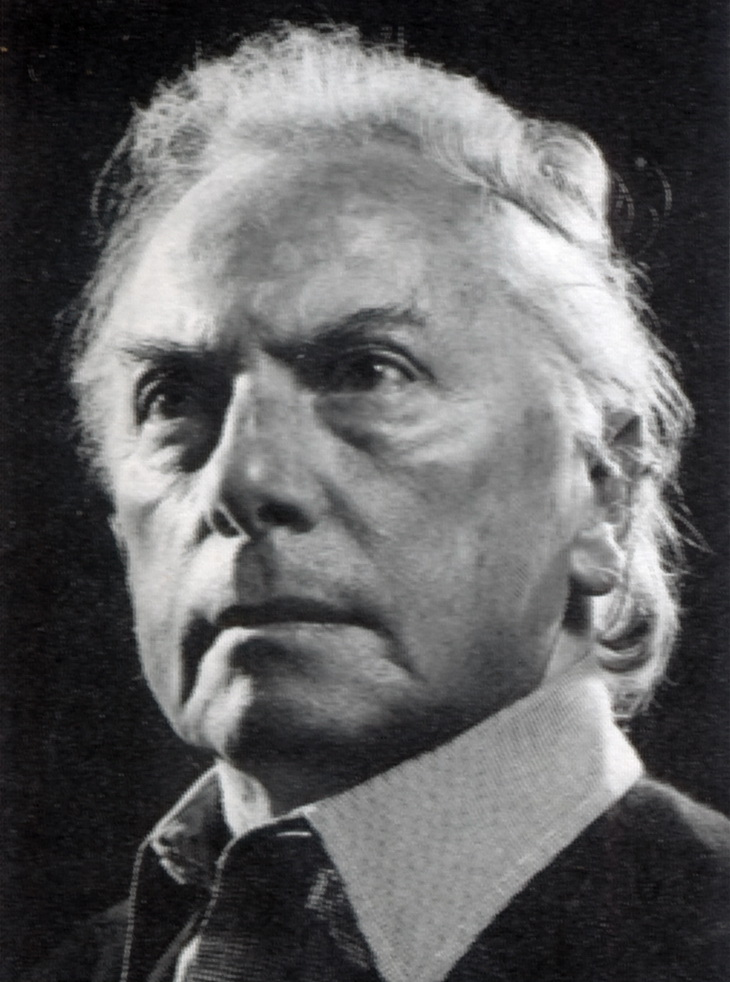
Andrzej Panufnik

- 2 October – Peter Heyworth, music critic and biographer (born 1921, United States)
- 5 October – Martin Ennals, human rights activist (born 1927)
- 6 October – Elaine Burton, Baroness Burton of Coventry, politician (born 1904)
- 12 October – Taso Mathieson, racing driver and author (born 1908)
- 13 October
  - Donald Houston, actor (born 1923)
  - Hugh Molson, Baron Molson, politician (born 1903)
- 17 October – J. G. Devlin, actor (born 1907)
- 20 October – Clifford Last, English-born Australian sculptor (born 1918)
- 22 October – Joy Harington, actress, writer, producer and director (born 1914)
- 23 October – Job Stewart, actor (born 1934)
- 25 October – John Stratton, actor (born 1925)
- 27 October
  - George Barker, poet (born 1913)
  - Sir Andrzej Panufnik, composer and musician (born 1914, Poland)
- 29 October
  - Sir Cyril Black, politician (born 1902)
  - Donald Churchill, actor and playwright (born 1930)
  - Sir Nigel Poett, Army general (born 1907)

=== November ===
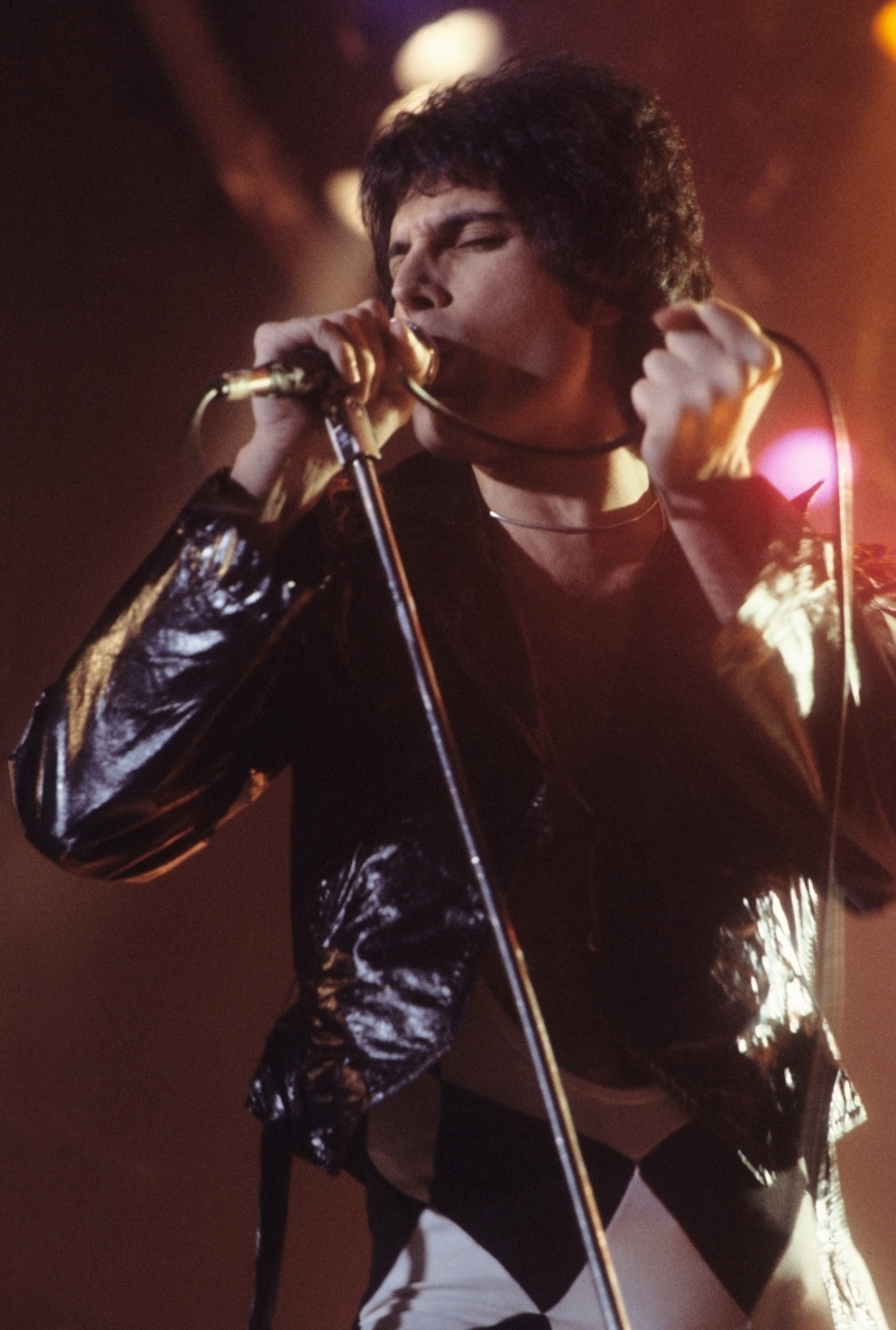
Freddie Mercury

- 3 November – Raymond Blackburn, politician (born 1915)
- 5 November – Robert Maxwell, media proprietor (born 1923, Czechoslovakia)
- 8 November – Dave Rowbotham, singer (born 1958); murdered by unknown hand
- 10 November – Marjorie Abbatt, toy-maker and businesswoman (born 1899)
- 11 November – Nellie Halstead, athlete (born 1910)
- 14 November – Tony Richardson, film director (born 1928)
- 17 November – Eileen Agar, painter and photographer (born 1899, Argentina)
- 18 November
  - Reg Parlett, artist (born 1904)
  - J. P. Stern, literary scholar (born 1920, Austria)
- 24 November
  - Anton Furst, production designer (born 1944); suicide in the United States
  - Freddie Mercury, singer (Queen) (born 1946)

=== December ===
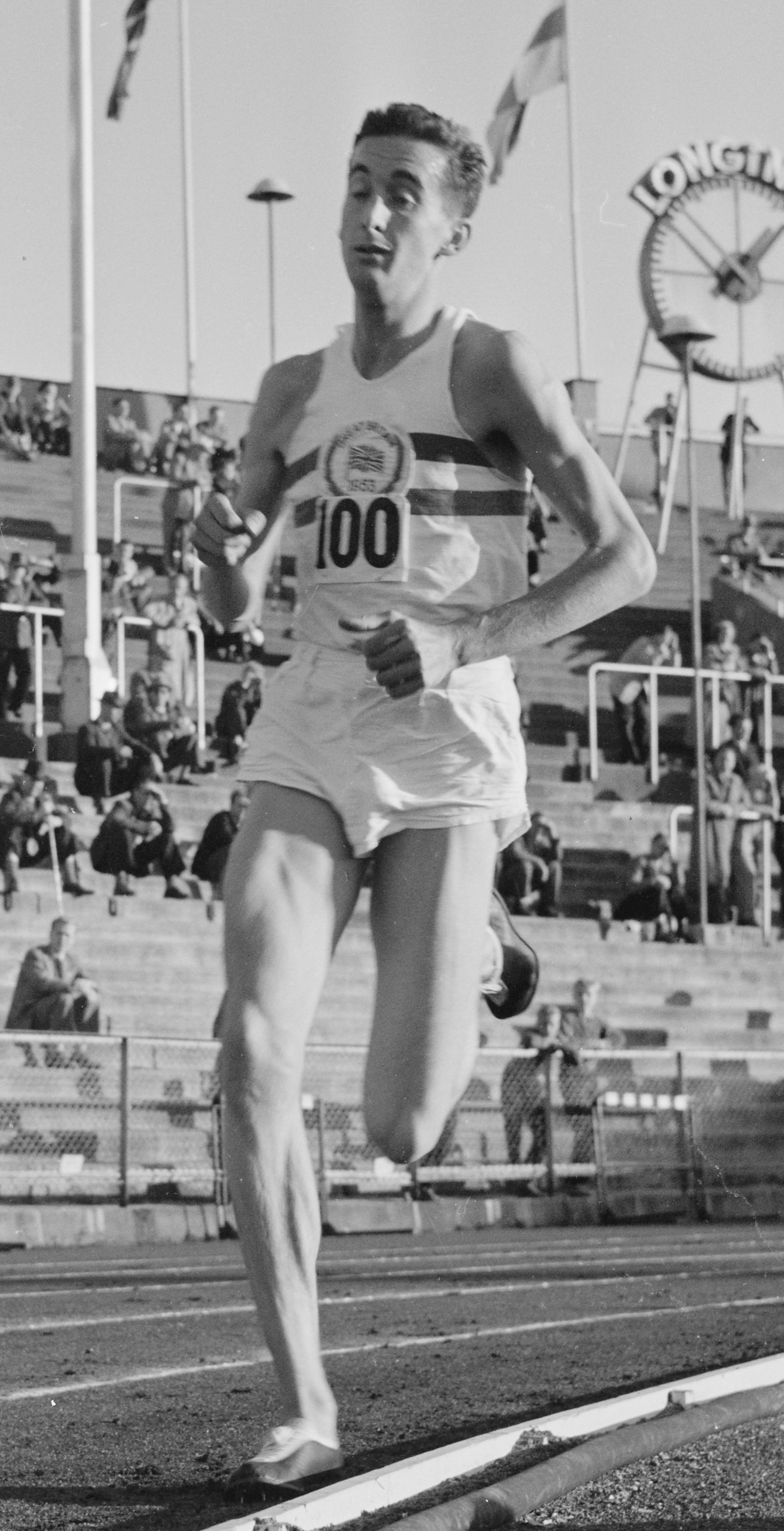
Gordon Pirie

- 3 December – Alex Graham, cartoonist (born 1918)
- 4 December – Cliff Bastin, English footballer (born 1912)
- 5 December – Jack Trevor Story, novelist (born 1917)
- 6 December
  - Rodney Ackland, actor, playwright and screenwriter (born 1908)
  - Mimi Smith, nurse, secretary and aunt of John Lennon (born 1906)
  - Richard Stone, economist, Nobel Prize laureate (born 1913)
- 7 December
  - Dame Judith Hart, politician, first woman Paymaster General (born 1924)
  - Gordon Pirie, long-distance runner (born 1931)
- 12 December – Ronnie Ross, jazz saxophonist (born 1933)
- 14 December
  - John Arlott, journalist, author and cricket commentator (born 1914)
  - Robert Eddison, actor (born 1908)
- 15 December – Ray Smith, actor (born 1936)
- 16 December – H. C. Casserley, railway photographer (born 1903)
- 18 December – George Abecassis, racing driver (born 1913)
- 19 December – Paul Maxwell, actor (born 1921)
- 20 December
  - John Brian Harley, cartographer (born 1932)
  - Samuel Rabin, artist and Olympic wrestler (born 1903)
- 21 December – Colin Douglas, actor (born 1912)
- 28 December – Sir Alfred Dudley Ward, Army general (born 1905)
- 29 December – Dora Gordine, sculptor (born 1895, Russian Empire)
- 31 December – Christopher Steel, composer (born 1938)

== See also ==
- 1991 in British music
- 1991 in British television
- List of British films of 1991
