= Kaberry =

Kaberry is a surname. Notable people with the surname include:

- Anthony Kaberry (born 1971), Australian rugby league footballer
- Donald Kaberry, Baron Kaberry of Adel (1907–1991), British politician
- Lewis Kaberry (1878–1962), Australian theatre architect, partner in Kaberry and Chard
- Phyllis Kaberry (1910–1977), Australian anthropologist

== See also ==
- Kaberry baronets
