= Venom (The Shermans song) =

Single by The Shermans
- B-side: "You're Just Not Getting Enough"; "Venom (Full Version)"
- Released: 13 April 2009
- Recorded: Unknown
- Genre: Indie rock
- Length: 2:58
- Label: Platform Records
- Songwriters: Shaun Aitcheson, Graham Middleton, Nick Cheetham, Kenny McDonald, Dave Cumming
- Producer: The Shermans

The Shermans singles chronology
"Calling It Wrong" (2007)	"Venom" (2009)	"Obsolete" (2009)

"Venom" is a song and an EP by The Shermans, released as their second single on April 13, 2009.

== Track listing ==
No.	Title	Length
1.	"Venom" (Radio Edit)	2:58
2.	"You're Just Not Getting Enough"	4:35
3.	"Venom" (Full Version)	3:49

== Charts ==
Chart (2009)	Peak Position
UK Indie Chart	10
