= Calling It Wrong =

EP by the Shermans
- Released: 21 April 2007
- Recorded: Unknown
- Genre: Indie rock
- Length: 2:58
- Label: Platform
- Producer: The Shermans

The Shermans chronology
Calling It Wrong (2007)	Venom (2009)

Calling It Wrong is an EP by the Shermans, released as their first single on April 21, 2007.

== Album cover ==
The album cover uses the font (apart from the first line) is webdings. It reads, from top to bottom: "The Shermans", "Calling It Wrong", "Smile Has Gone", "Wendy", "Shaun", "Kenny", "Graham", "Chris", "Dave", and "We Love You All". The names are of the band members, apart from "Chris". This may be the nickname of Nick Cheetham, whose first name is not on the cover.

== Track listing ==
1. "Calling It Wrong" – 2:58
2. "Smile Has Gone" – 2:39
3. "Wendy" – 4:24

== Charts ==
Chart (2007)	Peak position
UK Indie Chart	23
