= Natasha England =

Scottish pop singer (born 1952)

- Also known as: Natasha
- Born: Dorothy Natasha Sherratt; 18 December 1952 (age 73); Glasgow, Scotland
- Genres: Pop, jazz, blues
- Years active: 1978–1985; 2007–present
- Labels: Towerbell Records, Platform Records
- Website: http://www.natashaengland.co.uk

Natasha England (born Dorothy Natasha Sherratt, 18 December 1952), often credited as Natasha, is a Scottish pop singer. She is most well known for her hit version of "Iko Iko" which reached number 10 on the UK Singles Chart in 1982.

== Biography ==
She was born in Glasgow, Scotland, and after winning a dance competition moved to London in the early 1970s to develop a career in the music business. She worked as a dancer and formed her own band, playing in clubs, while also working behind the scenes in the management of such stars as Marc Bolan, Rod Stewart and David Bowie. She married Bob England in 1975, and they formed their own management and production company. They also set up the Towerbell record label, and discovered and managed the band Darts, who had a series of hits after being signed to Magnet Records. Later, the pair were responsible for setting up the Rockney label for Chas and Dave.

Natasha formed a girl group, Flirts, with sisters Betty and Jackie Burns. They recorded for Magnet in the late 1970s but with little commercial success. She then recorded for Decca as Natasha and the Delites. Credited as Natasha, she released eleven solo singles on Towerbell, including "I Can’t Hold On" (which did not chart) and then "Iko Iko" in 1982. Her version of the song was released almost simultaneously as a version by the all-female band The Belle Stars. Natasha appeared on Top of the Pops, and the song rose to number 10 on the UK singles chart in the summer of 1982 (the Belle Stars version peaked at number 35 in the UK but was later a Top 20 hit in the US). Natasha's version also charted in Ireland reaching number 7, Israel reaching number 6, and New Zealand where it peaked at number 5 as well as scoring the 26th-biggest selling single of the year. Her follow-up single "The Boom Boom Room" reached number 44 on the UK singles chart later in the year, and her album Captured reached number 53 on the UK albums chart. However, later singles on Towerbell, and a second, largely self-penned album Don't Walk Away, had less success.

After her marriage to Bob England ended in the mid-1980s she left the music business, and worked with horses and on animal rights issues. She moved to Canada and sang with the band Why before returning to England in the early 1990s. A few years later she was diagnosed with breast cancer, but eventually returned to the music industry. When she relaunched her career in 2007 via Platform Records, her 1982 single "Iko Iko" was given its first digital release, along with a 42-track anthology Back From The Mists of Time which included her entire 1980s output. A new album Deeper Into Reality followed in 2010, a collaboration with experimental producer Robert Logan. Further releases have included a 2013 cover of the T. Rex song "Get It On", and a 2015 single, "Work It Out".

Natasha's version of "Iko Iko" enjoyed a resurgence after Platform Records licensed it to the soundtrack of the highest-grossing Italian film of 2014, Un Boss In Salotto.

A new single and 13-track album were released on 10 August 2018, entitled Somehow.

A 21 track compilation album was released on August 20, 2021, entitled Iko Iko - The Best Of Natasha England.

Natasha's song "Running" was included in the soundtrack to 2023 American crime drama television series Snowfall and was also heard in a 2024 episode of the American drama mystery show Pretty Little Liars.
