= Twilight Café (The Demo Collection 1981–1985) =

Studio album by Susan Fassbender & Kay Russell
- Released: 30 April 2012
- Recorded: 1981–1985
- Genre: Pop
- Length: 71:10
- Label: Platform Records

Twilight Café (The Demo Collection 1981–1985) is an album of demo recordings by Susan Fassbender and Kay Russell, best known for their UK Top 30 hit "Twilight Café" in 1981. The album consists of material recorded in the early 1980s, but which remained unreleased until 2012. Five of the songs are Kay Russell solo tracks.

== Recording ==
After Fassbender and Russell achieved chart success with "Twilight Café" in early 1981, their two follow-up singles did not chart, and they were dropped by their label CBS. The two musicians had already recorded a number of demos for a possible album release which ultimately never came to fruition, and continued to record occasionally during the early 1980s. Russell kept all these recordings, and thirty years later she decided to have them digitally remastered and released after seeing considerable fan interest on YouTube. The choice of songs and the running order were decided by Platform Records.

The five Kay Russell solo tracks are: "Matter of Time", "Crisis", "Too Crazy", "Yesterday's Hero" and "Walking in Space". Russell recalled that "Walking in Space" had been Fassbender's favourite.

== Track listing ==
- All tracks written by Susan Fassbender and Kay Russell, except where stated.
1. "Twilight Café" – 3:07
2. "Lies" – 3:00
3. "Runner" – 4:12
4. "Matter of Time" (Russell) – 3:05
5. "Stay" – 4:03
6. "Doppelganger" – 3:20
7. "Cry for Love" – 3:38
8. "Crisis" (Russell) – 2:53
9. "Heat on the Street" – 2:55
10. "Merry Go Round" – 3:09
11. "Beat the System" – 3:04
12. "Cargo" – 3:50
13. "Too Crazy" (Russell) – 3:14
14. "Letter" – 3:20
15. "Eliliath" – 4:17
16. "Yesterday's Hero" (Russell) – 3:50
17. "Coming On Strong" – 4:05
18. "Now You're Gone" – 5:09
19. "This Has Got to Stop" – 2:39
20. "Walking in Space" (Russell) – 4:20

== Personnel ==
- Susan Fassbender – vocals, keyboards
- Kay Russell – vocals, guitar
- All tracks mastered from cassette by William at Soundworks Studios, Leeds. Additional mastering, sound processing, track compilation and pack shot design by Ewan McKenzie. Pack shot pencil drawings by Dianima.
