= The Shermans =

Scottish indie rock band

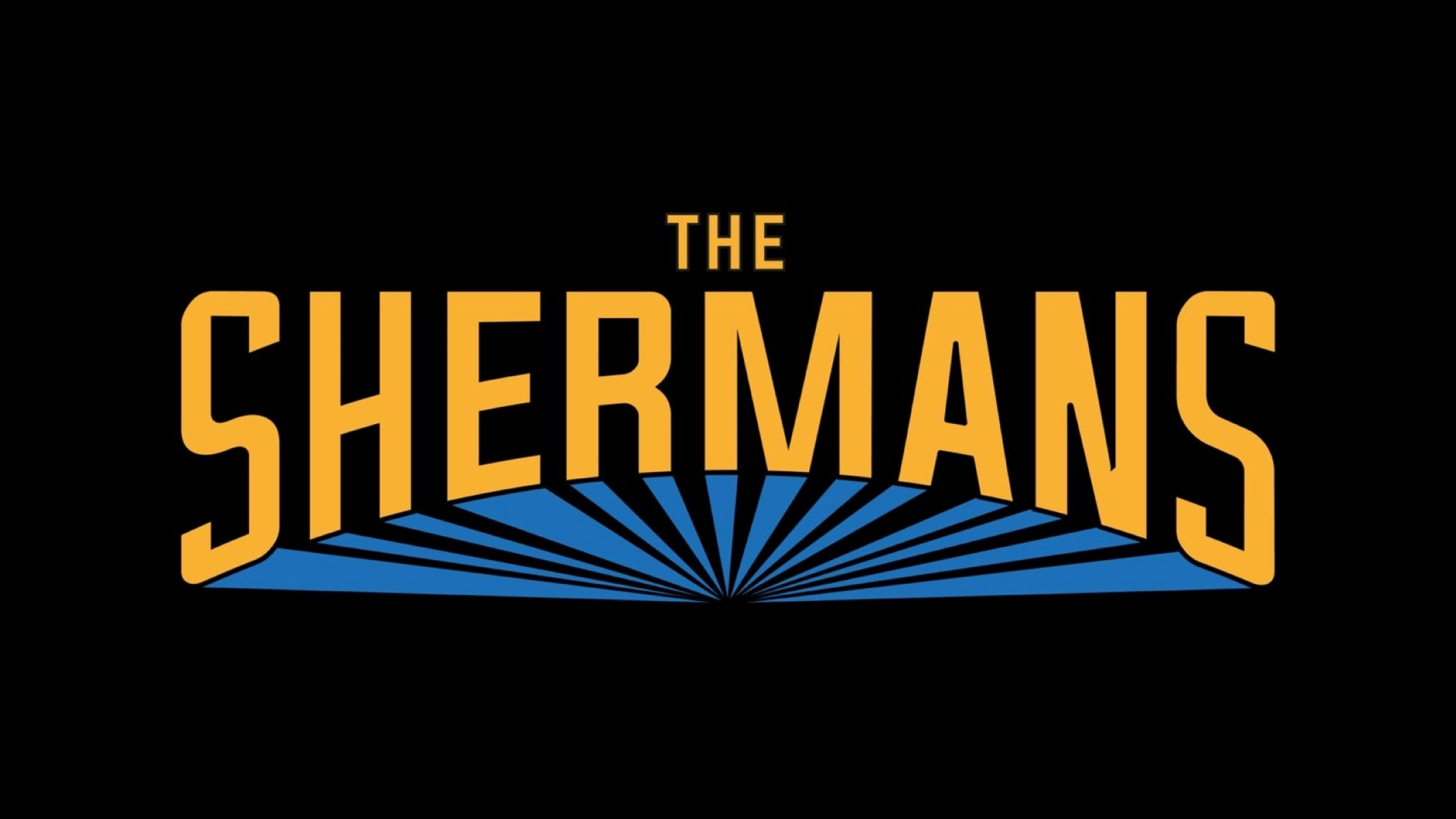
- The Shermans Logo

Background information
- Origin: Stirling, Scotland
- Genres: Indie rock Pop; Alternative rock
- Years active: 2006 – Present
- Label: Platform Records
- Members: Shaun Aitcheson; Nick Cheetham; Kenny McDonald; Dave Cumming; Chris Kerr
- Website: Instagraam: @theshermansband

The Shermans are an indie rock band from Stirling, Scotland. They included various styles such as punk, pop, and alternative rock in their music.

The band are signed to Platform Records and their debut single, "Calling It Wrong", was released on 21 April 2007. The single entered the UK Indie Chart and the Scottish charts on 28 April, reaching numbers 20 and 23 respectively. The band's second single, "Venom", was released on 13 April 2009. The single reached number 10 in the UK Indie Chart and number 7 in Scotland. They announced an "indefinite hiatus" on 27 January 2010, marking the end of The Sherman, however have since been playing some shows together.

The Shermans announced their return to the studio in 2024, releasing a new Platform Records single "Silhouette", on 29 November 2024.
