= Carlton Club bombing =

1990 bomb attack by the Provisional IRA in London

Coordinates: 51°30′21″N 0°08′20″W

- Part of the Troubles
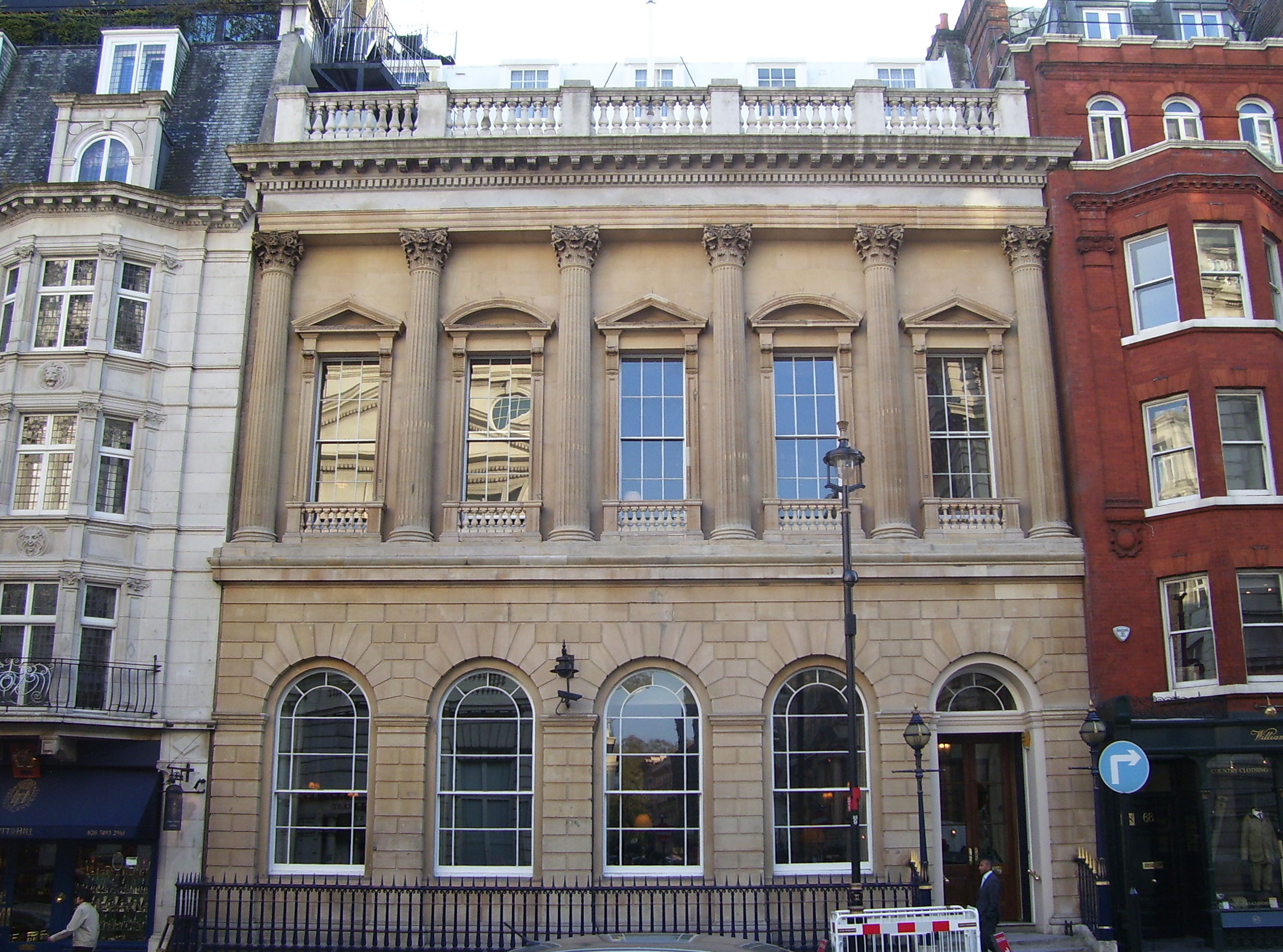
- Front of the clubhouse in 2009
- Location: London, United Kingdom
- Date: 25 June 1990
- Target: Conservative politicians
- Attack type: Bomb
- Deaths: 1
- Injuries: 20
- Perpetrator: Provisional Irish Republican Army

On 25 June 1990, the Provisional IRA detonated a bomb at the Carlton Club, a club in London popular among MPs and supporters of the ruling Conservative Party. The bombing injured 20 people, one of whom, Lord Kaberry of Adel, died a year later. The ground floor collapsed to the basement and windows were shattered. The blast was felt up to half a mile away.

In a statement, the IRA said: "Like Brighton in 1984, the IRA has brought the war directly to those who keep the British Army on the streets and in the fields of Ireland. While such occupation continues, and the Nationalist people face daily oppression, the policy makers and their military arm will not be safe." The attack was part of the IRA's escalating campaign that started in early 1990 and which had claimed two lives and 27 injuries since May that year. The conservative MP for Fulham Matthew Carrington called the attack very "worrying" as it was a non-military target, suggesting a dangerous tactic from the IRA against members of the public.

The bomb contained 15 lb (6.8 kg) of Semtex explosives. Prime Minister Margaret Thatcher arrived at the club shortly after the bombing and spoke with some of the victims.

== See also ==
- Chronology of Provisional Irish Republican Army actions (1990–1991)
- Brighton hotel bombing
- Downing Street mortar attack
