= Kaberry baronets =

United Kingdom baronetage

The Kaberry Baronetcy, of Adel cum Eccup in the City of Leeds, is a title in the Baronetage of the United Kingdom. It was created on 28 January 1960 for the Conservative politician Donald Kaberry. In 1983 he was further honoured when he was created a life peer as Baron Kaberry of Adel, of Adel in the City of Leeds, in the Peerage of the United Kingdom. The life barony became extinct on his death while he was succeeded in the baronetcy by his eldest son, the second and (as of 2010) present holder of the title.

== Kaberry baronets, of Adel cum Eccup (1960) ==
- The Right Honourable Sir Donald Kaberry, 1st Baronet and Baron Kaberry of Adel (1907–1991) (created Baron Kaberry of Adel in 1983)
- The Honourable Sir Christopher Donald "Kit" Kaberry, 2nd Baronet (born 1943)

The heir apparent is the present holder's son James Christopher Kaberry (born 1970). His heir-in-line is his eldest son Jonathan James Alexander Kaberry (born 1989).

== Arms ==
Coat of arms of Kaberry baronets

Crest
On a wreath Or Sable and Azure a weeping willow tree Proper pendent from the trunk thereof by a ring a fleece Or.
Escutcheon
Per fess Argent and Azure a pile reversed counterchanged three double-wards keys upwards also Azure each enfiled by a chaplet of holly fructed Proper and of roses Argent barbed and seeded also Proper.
Motto
Laboro Fide
