= Anthony Kaberry =

Australian rugby league player

Personal information
- Full name: Anthony Kaberry
- Born: 5 August 1971 (age 53)

Playing information
- Position: Prop, Second-row
Club
Years	Team	Pld	T	G	FG	P
1992–94	South Sydney Rabbitohs	16	0	0	0	0
1995–96	St. George Dragons	4	0	0	0	0
	Total	20	0	0	0	0

Anthony Kaberry (born 5 April 1971) is an Australian former professional rugby league footballer who played in the 1990s.

== Background ==
Kaberry played his junior rugby league at Matraville Tigers.

== Playing career ==
Kaberry started his career at the South Sydney Rabbitohs, his local club, in the 1992 NSWRL season. He made his debut in the front row against the Parramatta Eels as his Rabbitohs lost 26–20. He later played three more games that year for Souths, all from the interchange. Two seasons later, he played another 12 matches for South Sydney, either in the second row or off the bench.

The following year, for the 1995 ARL season, Kaberry made the move to the St. George Dragons. There he played 3 matches that season, either as a starting prop or on the bench. The following year, he played just one game from the interchange against his former club.
