= Susan Fassbender =

English singer-songwriter (1959–1991)

- Born: Susan Kathryn Whincup; 30 April 1959; Wibsey, Bradford, West Yorkshire, England
- Died: 2 May 1991 (aged 32) Bradford, West Yorkshire
- Genres: Pop, new wave
- Instruments: Vocals, keyboards, piano
- Years active: 1980–1985
- Labels: CBS, Platform Records

Susan Fassbender (born Susan Kathryn Whincup, later Baggio, 30 April 1959 – 2 May 1991) was an English singer, songwriter and musician best remembered for the single "Twilight Café", which reached No. 21 in the UK Singles Chart in February 1981.

== Life and career ==
Born in Wibsey, Bradford, West Yorkshire, England, Fassbender (which was her mother's maiden name) began studying classical piano, clarinet and timpani (later also playing synthesizer) at age 13. Eventually she met guitarist Kay Russell, who became her songwriting partner throughout her career. Both women wrote lyrics and melodies together. Prior to their collaboration, Russell was with poet Nick Toczek in a Bradford-based new wave outfit called Ulterior Motives.

After impressing their future manager Alan Brown at a musical instrument shop, Fassbender and Russell signed to independent record label Criminal Records and wrote "Twilight Café", which was released in 1980. Two appearances on BBC Television's Top of the Pops followed in January 1981, with a band also consisting of drummer Gary Walsh and bassist Mike Close. By this point, ownership of the single had passed from Criminal to CBS Records. In March 1981, Fassbender appeared on German television programme, Disco.

Two other singles followed soon after, namely "Stay" and "Merry-Go-Round". "Stay", the second single, was promoted by an appearance on Cheggers Plays Pop, a children's programme. Both tracks were collaborations between Fassbender and Russell. In January 1982, Fassbender and Russell appeared on another British TV show, Multi-Coloured Swap Shop, to promote "Merry-Go-Round".

After release of the latter singles, Fassbender and Russell both retired temporarily from the music industry, to marry and for Fassbender to raise three daughters. She was married in 1983, when her name became Susan Baggio. Further songs were written, separately and together, by both women, but no further interest was shown by the industry in releasing the songs, until 2012, when Platform Records approached Kay Russell with a view to re-mastering a collection of demos from cassette tapes preserved by Russell, resulting in the release of Twilight Café (The Demo Collection 1981–1985) on 30 April 2012.

Later, in 2017, Kay Russell began a song-writing collaboration with Platform Records's Ewan McKenzie, yielding two albums of songs released under the name 'The McKenzie FIX', with Russell contributing backing vocals on the second record, 2024 release 'Media Hack'.

Fassbender died by suicide on 2 May 1991, at the age of 32. Russell died after a short illness on 29 September 2024, at the age of 72.

== Discography ==
=== Singles ===
- "Twilight Café" / "(We'll) Get Around It" (1980) UK #21, IE #24
- "Stay" / "Comment Ça Va" (24 April 1981) – released as "Fassbender–Russell"
- "Merry-Go-Round" / "Reasons" (1981)

"Twilight Café" was released on Criminal Records and later CBS in both the UK and Germany, and on Lark Records in Belgium and the Netherlands, also later on CBS. The latter two singles reverted to Criminal and Lark. "Twilight Café" was also available as a 12" maxi single in Germany. All tracks were written by Fassbender and Russell.

=== Albums ===
- Twilight Café (The Demo Collection 1981–1985) (April 2012, Platform Records)
- Building A Dream (June 2016, Platform Records)
- Live in Concert (1981) (June 2016, Platform Records)

In 2012, Platform Records released Twilight Café (The Demo Collection 1981–1985), a 20 track album of previously unavailable recordings from Susan Fassbender and Kay Russell. The collection included the original demo version of the duo's hit single, as well as other songs familiar to Fassbender/Russell fans, including several of those featured on the second and final of their CBS 7" singles. The release contained 70 minutes of music, remastered from cassette tapes preserved by Kay Russell.

A follow-up collection entitled Building A Dream (The Demo Collection Volume 2) containing 17 further recordings, was released on 17 June 2016, along with a separate 10 track release entitled Live in Concert (1981).

== Other source ==
- Record Mirror, p. 8, "Into the Twilight Zone", 24 January 1981
