= Platform Records =

UK-based independent record label

- Founded: 2007
- Founder: Ewan McKenzie
- Distributor: Shellshock/Pinnacle/AWAL/EmuBands
- Genre: Indie rock, indie pop, pop rock, electronic music
- Country of origin: United Kingdom
- Location: London, England
- Official website: http://www.platformrecords.co.uk

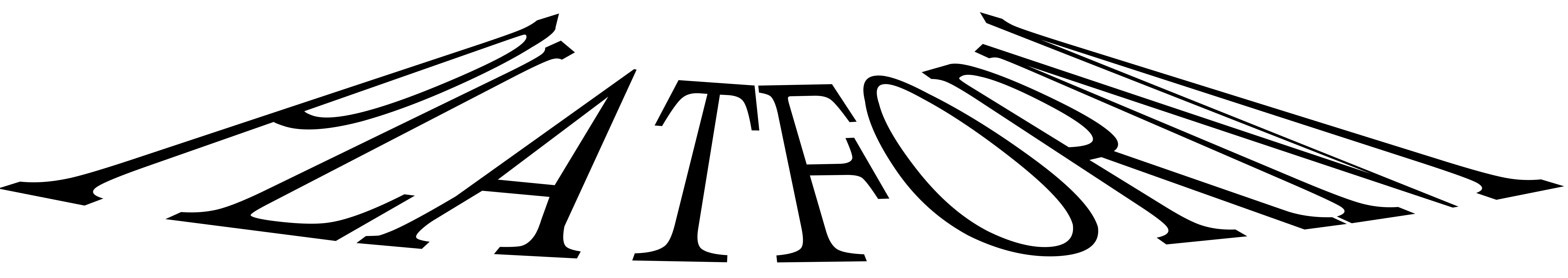
Platform Records label logo

Platform Records is a UK-based independent record label, created in Edinburgh in 2007.

Initial artists included The Shermans who scored two UK Independent Chart top 30 singles with "Calling It Wrong" (peaking at number 23), and "Venom" (peaking at number 10) which also reached number 7 in Scotland.

Other notable Platform acts have included Dead Sea Souls, The OK Social Club, Lloyd James Fay and Susan Fassbender & Kay Russell whose album Twilight Café (The Demo Collection 1981–1985) included the original demo of their top 30 single "Twilight Cafe".

Natasha England relaunched her career via Platform Records in 2007 with the first digital release of her 1982 top 10 single "Iko Iko" and 42-track anthology Back From The Mists of Time.

In later years the business concentrated mainly on sync licensing to various media, including games and TV shows, with their biggest placement to date in the 2014 Warner Bros. film Un Boss in Salotto (A Boss in the Living Room).

Several Platform releases were synced to trailers of the 2017 Steam distributed game Die Young, including Frederic Andre's "Where Is She Now", The Ultra's "Universe In Two" and Australian duo Gypsy & The Cat's song "Fire" licensed to the official soundtrack album.

In 2020, "The Late 90's" by Edinburgh artist Ella's Brother was licensed for use as the opening theme music to BBC One football magazine series A View from the Terrace.

On 16 August 2021, Platform release "Starting Over" by Lonely Lost Boy reached number 10 on the ITunes Store Singer-songwriter daily chart.

Natasha England's song 'Running' was licensed to the 2023 soundtrack of American crime drama television series Snowfall (TV series) and to a 2024 episode of the American drama mystery show Pretty Little Liars (2022 TV series).

Sub labels include Whimsical Records, N.E Records, Crystal Seven Records and The Music Elevator.

== Roster ==
=== Platform records ===
Selected roster (including on sub labels) past and present:

- The Shermans
- Natasha England
- Susan Fassbender & Kay Russell
- Jack Butler
- Emporium
- The OK Social Club
- Dead Sea Souls
- The Encierro
- Lloyd James Fay
- The Ultra
- Frederic Andre
- George Diaz
- Ella's Brother
- Lonely Lost Boy
- The McKenzie FIX
