= Donald Kaberry, Baron Kaberry of Adel =

British politician (1907–1991)

The Right Honourable The Lord Kaberry of Adel Bt MC TD DL

Member of Parliament; for Leeds North West
- In office 23 February 1950 – 13 May 1983
- Preceded by: Constituency established
- Succeeded by: Keith Hampson

Personal details
- Born: Donald Kaberry; 18 August 1907
- Died: 13 March 1991 (aged 83) Leeds, England
- Spouse: Lily Scott (m. 1940)
- Children: 3
- Profession: Solicitor

Donald Kaberry, Baron Kaberry of Adel, MC, TD, DL (18 August 1907 – 13 March 1991), known as Sir Donald Kaberry, 1st Baronet, from 1960 to 1983, was a Conservative Party politician in the United Kingdom. He served as a Member of Parliament (MP) for 33 years and was later a life peer. In 1990, he was injured in the Carlton Club bombing by the Provisional Irish Republican Army, leading to his death the following year.

== Biography ==
Donald Kaberry was the son of Abraham Kaberry. He was educated at Leeds Grammar School and became a solicitor (a partner in Ford and Warren, Leeds) and company director, becoming chairman of W.H. Baxter Ltd and E. Walker & Co Ltd. He served as a councillor on Leeds City Council 1930–50, except for his period of army service during World War II. He was eventually made an honorary Alderman of the City Council. He also served from 1974 as special trustee of the Leeds Teaching Hospitals and in 1976 was made a Deputy Lieutenant of the West Yorkshire metropolitan county.

Kaberry enlisted in the Royal Artillery and commanded a battery at Dunkirk, receiving a Mention in Despatches. The citation at National Archives indicates that the decoration was a Military Cross for "... a courageous example of calm leadership to all ranks." After the war he was, as lieutenant-colonel, president of the military governing board at Hamburg. In 1947 he was awarded the Territorial Decoration (TD).

Kaberry was Member of Parliament (MP) for Leeds North West from 1950 to 1983, preceding Dr. Keith Hampson. He was a member of the Speaker's panel of chairmen in the House of Commons and an assistant government whip from 1952 to 1955 and parliamentary secretary at the Board of Trade 1955. He served as Conservative Party Vice-Chairman Organisation, 1955–61, and chairman of the Association of Conservative Clubs in 1961. During his time as vice-chairman, he was in position to receive a note from future British Prime Minister Margaret Thatcher following the birth of her twin children informing him that she was interested in a "return to active politics."

== Personal life ==
Kaberry was created a baronet, of Adel cum Eccup in the City of Leeds, in 1960, and on his retirement from the House of Commons in 1983 he was made a life peer as Baron Kaberry of Adel, of Adel in the City of Leeds.

In 1940, Kaberry married Lily, daughter of Edmund Scott of Morley, West Yorkshire, with whom he had three sons.

== Death ==
Kaberry was injured by smoke inhalation in the IRA bombing of London's Carlton Club in June 1990, leading to a terminal decline in his health which resulted in his death, at Leeds General Infirmary, on 13 March 1991. The life barony became extinct on his death while he was succeeded in the baronetcy by his son Christopher.

== Representation in drama ==
Kaberry is portrayed in the 2008 television drama The Long Walk to Finchley, on Margaret Thatcher's early career; he is played by Oliver Ford Davies.

Coat of arms of Donald Kaberry, Baron Kaberry of Adel

Crest
On a wreath Or Sable and Azure a weeping willow tree Proper pendent from the trunk thereof by a ring a fleece Or.
Escutcheon
Per fess Argent and Azure a pile reversed counterchanged three double-wards keys upwards also Azure each enfiled by a chaplet of holly fructed Proper and of roses Argent barbed and seeded also Proper.
Motto
Laboro Fide

Parliament of the United Kingdom
New constituency	Member of Parliament for Leeds North West; 1950–1983	Succeeded by Keith Hampson
Baronetage of the United Kingdom
New creation	Baronet (of Adel cum Eccup); 1960–1991	Succeeded by Christopher Donald Kaberry
