= N'Awlinz Dis Dat or d'Udda =

Studio album by Dr. John
- Released: July 13, 2004
- Studios: Piety Street Recording (New Orleans, LA); Right Track Recording (New York, NY); House Of Blues Studio (California)
- Genre: Blues
- Length: 1:08:00
- Label: Blue Note
- Producer: Stewart Levine

Dr. John chronology
Creole Moon (2001)	N'Awlinz Dis Dat or d'Udda (2004)	Mercernary (2006)

Professional ratings
Review scores
Source	Rating
AllMusic	3.5/5 stars
The Guardian	4/5 stars
laut.de	4/5 stars
Rolling Stone	2/5 stars

N'Awlinz Dis Dat or d'Udda is a studio album by American musician Dr. John. It was released on July 13, 2004, via Blue Note Records. It was recorded at Piety Street Recording in New Orleans with additional recording at Right Track Recording in New York City and House Of Blues Studio in California. Production was handled by Stewart Levine.

At the 47th Annual Grammy Awards, the album has been nominated for a Grammy Award for Best Contemporary Blues Album and the song "Lay My Burden Down" received a nomination for a Grammy Award for Best Gospel Performance.

== Track listing ==
No.	Title	Writer(s)	Length
1.	"Quatre Parishe"	Malcolm John Rebennack, Jr.	2:14
2.	"When the Saints Go Marching In" (featuring Mavis Staples)	Traditional; Rebennack, Jr.	4:52
3.	"Lay My Burden Down" (featuring Mavis Staples and the Dirty Dozen Brass Band)	Traditional; Rebennack, Jr.	4:32
4.	"Marie Laveau" (featuring Cyril Neville and the Mardi Gras Indians)	Robert Gurley	6:49
5.	"Dear Old Southland" (featuring Nicholas Payton)	John Turner Layton, Jr.; Henry Creamer	2:41
6.	"Dis, Dat or d'Udda"	Rebennack, Jr.	4:20
7.	"Chickee le Pas" (featuring Cyril Neville and the Mardi Gras Indians)	Rebennack, Jr.	4:02
8.	"The Monkey" (featuring Eddie Bo and Dave Bartholomew)	David Bartholomew; Pearl King	3:49
9.	"Shango Tango" (featuring Willie Tee)	Rebennack, Jr.; Wilson Turbinton	1:27
10.	"I Ate Up the Apple Tree" (featuring Randy Newman)	Dave Albert Williams, Jr.	3:34
11.	"You Ain't Such a Much" (featuring Willie Nelson and Snooks Eaglin)	Joseph Pleasant	3:11
12.	"Life's a One Way Ticket"	Pleasant	4:25
13.	"Hen Layin' Rooster" (featuring B. B. King and Clarence "Gatemouth" Brown)	Rebennack, Jr.; Pleasant	3:35
14.	"Stakalee"	Rebennack, Jr.; Martin Kaelin	4:34
15.	"Eh Las Bas" (featuring Leroy Jones)	Edward Ory	2:35
16.	"St. James Infirmary" (featuring Eddie Bo)	Joe Primrose	4:40
17.	"Time Marches On" (featuring B. B. King, Willie Nelson and the Dirty Dozen Brass Band)	Louis Jordan; Joe Willoughby; Rebennack, Jr.	4:19
18.	"I'm Goin' Home" (featuring Cyril Neville)	Rebennack, Jr.	2:21
Total length:			1:08:00

== Personnel ==
- Mac "Dr. John" Rebennack Jr. – vocals (tracks: 2–4, 6–8, 10, 11, 13, 14, 16–18), piano (tracks: 1–3, 5, 8–14, 16–18), organ (tracks: 2, 13, 15), Wurlitzer electric piano (tracks: 4, 6, 7), guitar (tracks: 6–8), Fender Rhodes electric piano (track 12)
- Mavis Staples – vocals (tracks: 2, 3)
- The Davell Crawford Singers – backing vocals (tracks: 2, 3)
- Cyril Neville – vocals (tracks: 4, 7, 18), percussion (track 18)
- The Creolettes – vocals (tracks: 4, 6, 10, 14, 17, 18)
- The Mardi Gras Indians – vocals (tracks: 4, 7)
- Wilson "Willie Tee" Turbinton – vocals (tracks: 7, ), keyboards (tracks: 6, 7, 9, 16), organ (tracks: 6, 7, 13)
- Edwin "Eddie Bo" Bocage – vocals (tracks: 8, 16)
- Randy Newman – vocals (track 10)
- Willie Nelson – vocals (tracks: 11, 17), guitar (track 11)
- Fird "Snooks" Eaglin Jr. – vocals & guitar solo (track 11), guitar (track 17)
- Riley B. King – vocals (tracks: 13, 17)
- Bill Huntington – acoustic bass (tracks: 1–4, 7, 11–14, 18), banjo (track 3)
- Alfred "Uganda" Roberts – congas (tracks: 1, 4, 6, 8–10, 15, 16), bongos (track 12)
- Joachim Cooder – percussion (tracks: 1, 16)
- John Boudreaux – percussion (track 1)
- The Wardell Quezergue Strings – strings (tracks: 1, 4, 18)
- The Wardell Quezergue Horns – horns (tracks: 2, 4, 6, 7, 10–14, 16, 17)
- John Fohl – guitar (tracks: 2, 7, 11, 12, 14, 17)
- Steve Masakowski – guitar (track 2), acoustic guitar (track 9)
- Earl Palmer – drums (tracks: 2, 4, 7, 11–14, 17), snare (track 3)
- Joseph "Smokey" Johnson – tambourine (tracks: 2–4, 7, 8, 10–17), bass drum (tracks: 3, 17), percussion (tracks: 6, 9)
- Davell Crawford – backing vocals arrangement (track 2)
- The Dirty Dozen Brass Band – horns (tracks: 3, 17)
- Walter "Wolfman" Washington – guitar (tracks: 4, 10, 13, 17)
- David Barard – electric bass (tracks: 4, 6, 8–10, 15, 16)
- Herman "Roscoe" Ernest III – drums (tracks: 4, 6, 8–10, 15, 16, 18), tambourine (track 7)
- Kenyatta Simon – percussion (tracks: 4, 8, 9, 15)
- Nicholas Payton – trumpet (track 5)
- Dave Bartholomew – trumpet (track 8)
- Ralph Johnson Sr. – clarinet solo (track 12)
- Clarence "Gatemouth" Brown – viola solo (track 13)
- Leroy Jones – trumpet (track 15)
- Brian Quezergue – conductor
- Wardell Quezergue – horn and string arrangement
- Stewart Levine – producer
- Rik Pekkonen – engineering, mixing
- Jason Stasium – engineering
- Wesley Fontenot – Pro Tools, engineering assistant
- Kevin Meeker – engineering assistant
- Doug Tyo – engineering assistant
- Bernie Grundman – mastering
- Ed Gerrard – executive producer
- Peter Himberger – executive producer
- Cat Yellen Rebennack – cover photo
- Martin Kaelin – photography
- Shawn Hall – coordinator

== Charts ==
Chart (2004)	Peak position
Belgian Albums (Ultratop Flanders)	68
Italian Albums (FIMI)	51
UK Jazz & Blues Albums (Official Charts)	9
US Top Jazz Albums (Billboard)	7
