= It Ain't My Fault =

It Ain't My Fault or Ain't My Fault may refer to:

- It Ain't My Fault 1964 song by Smokey Johnson and Wardell Quezergue which is a continuing standard of New Orleans brass bands
- "It Ain't My Fault" (Silkk the Shocker song), 1998
- "It Ain't My Fault" (Brothers Osborne song), 2017
- "Ain't My Fault", a 2016 song by Zara Larsson
- "Ain't My Fault", a 2014 song by Mitch Goudy
- "Ain't My Fault", a 2015 song by Jamie Foxx from the album Hollywood: A Story of a Dozen Roses
