= List of churches in the Archdiocese of New Orleans =

As of 2024, the Archdiocese of New Orleans has 111 parishes and eight missions organized into ten deaneries.

The archdiocese encompasses eight civil parishes in Louisiana: St. Bernard, Jefferson (except Grand Isle), (Note: Unlike the rest of Jefferson Parish, the church of Grand Isle is not in the New Orleans archdiocese, but instead in the Diocese of Houma-Thibodaux.) New Orleans, Plaquemines, St. Charles, St. John the Baptist, St. Tammany, and Washington.

== Active parishes ==
=== Deanery I – Cathedral ===
All of the parishes in this deanery are in the City of New Orleans.

Parish name	Image	Address	Description
Blessed Francis Xavier Seelos		3053 Dauphine St.	Former St. Vincent De Paul church building, current building from 1866 with clock tower added 1924. Founded in 2001 with the merger of five parishes. Church damaged by fire in 2003.
Cathedral-Basilica of St. Louis, King of France		615 Pere Antoine Alley	First church on site constructed in 1722, later destroyed by fire. Cathedral consecrated in 1794. Became a minor basilica in 1964.
Corpus Christi-Epiphany		2022 St. Bernard Ave.	Founded in 2008 with the merger of Corpus Christi and Epiphany Parishes
Immaculate Conception		130 Baronne St.	Founded by the Jesuit order in 1851, present church dedicated in 1930
Our Lady of Guadalupe		411 North Rampart St.	Building constructed in 1826, making it the old church building in New Orleans. Founded as a parish in 1918
St. Augustine		1210 Governor Nicholls St.	Founded in 1841 for African-American Catholics, church dedicated in 1842
St. Joseph		1802 Tulane Ave.	Vincentian FathersFounded in 1844, present church dedicated in 1892
St. Josephine Bakhita		3501 N. Miro St.	Former St. Mary of the Angels church building, dedicated 1967. Founded in 2024 with the merger of St. Mary of the Angels and St. Mary Star of the Seas Parish.
St. Peter Claver		1923 St. Philip St.	Church dedicated in 1852 as St. Ann. Purchased by the Josephites in 1920 for African-American congregation, renamed St. Peter Claver Church.

=== Deanery II – City Park-Gentilly ===
All of the parishes in this deanery are in the City of New Orleans.

Parish name	Image	Address	Description
Mary Queen of Vietnam		5069 Willowbrook Dr.	Chapel constructed in 1976 for Vietnamese immigrants, became parish in 1983, current church consecrated in 1986
Our Lady of LaVang		6054 Vermillion Blvd.	
Our Lady of the Rosary		3368 Esplanade Ave.	Founded in 1907, church completed in 1925
Resurrection of Our Lord		9701 Hammond St.	Founded in 1963
St. Anthony of Padua		4640 Canal St.	Founded in 1827, present church dedicated in 1923
St. Dominic		775 Harrison Ave.	First church built by Dominicans in 1923, became a parish in 1924
St. Maria Goretti		7300 Crowder St.	Founded as a mission in 1920, became a parish in 1965, church completed in 1975
St. Martin De Porres		2212 Prentiss Ave.	Established in 2008 with the merger of St. Francis Cabrini, St. Raphael the Archangel and St. Thomas the Apostle Parishes.
St. Paul the Apostle		6828 Chef Menteur Hwy.	Founded in 1944, current church dedicated in 1955
St. Pius X		6666 Spanish Fort Blvd.	Founded in 1953.
St. Raymond & St. Leo the Great		2916 Paris Ave.	Founded in 2008 with the merger of St. Raymond and St. Leo the Great Parishes

=== Deanery III – Uptown ===
All of the parishes in this deanery are in the City of New Orleans.

Parish name	Image	Address	Description
Blessed Sacrament - St. Joan of Arc		8321 Burthe St.	Josephite (S.S.J.)
Blessed Trinity		4230 S. Broad St.	Founded in 2008 with the merger of Feast of the Transfiguration, Our Lady of Lourdes, St. Monica and St. Matthias Parishes
Good Shepherd		1025 Napoleon Ave.	Founded in 2008 with the merger of three parishes. St. Stephen Basilica used by parish
Holy Name of Jesus		6367 St. Charles Ave.	Church built by Jesuits, dedicated in 1892
Mater Dolorosa		1228 S Carrollton Ave.	Founded as a mission in 1847, became a parish in 1894, church dedicated in 1909
National Shrine of Our Lady of Prompt Succor		2701 State Street	
St. Alphonsus		2030 Constance Street, New Orleans	Church constructed by the Redemptorists in 1858 for German immigrants
St. Francis of Assisi		631 State St.	
St. Katharine Drexel		2015 Louisiana Ave.	Founded in 2008 with the merger of Holy Ghost and St. Francis De Sales Parishes. Mass celebrated in Holy Ghost Church
St. Mary's Assumption Church		923 Josephine Street, New Orleans	
St. Patrick		724 Camp St.	Founded in 1833 for Irish immigrants, church dedicated in 1840
St. Rita		2729 Lowerline St.	Founded in 1921, present church dedicated in 1963

=== Deanery IV – East Jefferson ===
This list contains parishes in Metairie, Kenner and other communities.

Parish name	Image	Address	Description
Divine Mercy		4337 Sal Lentini Pkwy, Kenner	Founded in 2008 with the merger of Nativity of Our Lord and St. Elizabeth Ann Seton Parishes
Our Lady of Divine Providence		1000 N. Starrett Rd, Metairie	
Our Lady of Perpetual Help		1908 Short St, Kenner	
St. Agnes		3310 Jefferson Hwy, Jefferson	Founded in 1931, current church dedicated in 1957
St. Angela Merici		901 Beverly Garden Dr, Metairie	Founded in 1964, church completed in 1965
St. Ann Church and National Shrine		4940 Meadowdale St, Metairie	
St. Benilde		1901 Division St, Metairie	Founded in 1964, current church dedicated in 1967
St. Catherine of Siena		105 Bonnabel Blvd, Metairie	Founded in 1921, present church dedicated in 1957
St. Christopher the Martyr		309 Manson Ave, Metairie	Founded in 1947, church dedicated that same year.
St. Clement of Rome		4317 Richland Ave, Metairie	Founded in 1985, present church dedicated in 1980
St. Edward the Confessor		4921 West Metairie Ave, Metairie	Founded in 1964, church dedicated in 1965
St. Francis Xavier		444 Metairie Rd, Metairie	Current church dedicated 2010. Older church from 1938 is now St. Joseph's Hall.
St. Jerome		2400 33rd St, Kenner	
St. Louis King of France		1609 Carrollton, Metairie	Founded as a mission in 1921, became a parish in 1947, current church started construction in 1959
St. Mary Magdalen		6425 W Metairie Ave, Metairie	Founded in 1955
St. Matthew the Apostle		10021 Jefferson Hwy, River Ridge	Founded in 1959.
St. Philip Neri		6500 Kawanee Ave, Metairie	Founded in 1960, present church dedicated in 1979
St. Rita of Cascia		7100 Jefferson Hwy, Harahan	Founded in 1950

=== Deanery V – St. John-St. Charles ===
This list contains parishes in several small communities.

Parish name	Image	Address	Description
Ascension of Our Lord		799 Fairway Dr, Laplace	
Holy Family		155 Holy Family Ln, Luling	Founded as a mission in 1977, became a parish in 1980, current church dedicated in 2001
Our Lady of Grace		772 Highway 44, Reserve	Josephite (S.S.J.)
Our Lady of the Holy Rosary		1 Rectory Ln, Hahnville	Founded in 1877, current church completed in 1964
Sacred Heart of Jesus		401 Spruce St, Norco	Founded in 1959, current church dedicated in 1979
St. Anthony of Padua		234 Angus Dr, Luling	
St. Charles Borromeo		13396 River Rd, Destrehan	Founded in 1723, it is the second oldest parish in the archdiocese.
St. Hubert		176 Anthony Monica St, Garyville	
St. Joan of Arc		529 W. 5th St, Laplace	Founded in 1947, church dedicated in 1980
St. John the Baptist		2361 Hwy. 18, Edgard	Founded in 1772, it is the third oldest parish in the archdiocese. Present church consecrated in 1920
St. Mark		10771 River Rd, Ama	Founded as a mission in the 1890s, church dedicated around 1898, became a parish in 1974
St. Michael the Archangel		15405 Hwy 90, Paradis	
St. Peter		1551 Hwy 44, Reserve	Founded in 1864

=== Deanery VI – Westbank ===
This list contains parishes in Marrero, Gretna and other small communities.

Parish name	Image	Address	Description
Assumption of Mary		172 Andre Dung Lac Dr, Avondale	
Christ the King		535 Deerfield Rd, Terrytown	Founded in 1962, current church consecrated in 1982
Immaculate Conception		4401 7th St, Marrero	Founded in 1919, became a parish in 1924, current church dedicated in 1967
Mary Help of Christians		Harvey	
Our Lady of Prompt Succor		146 4th St, Westwego	Founded in 1920, church dedicated that same year
St. Agnes Le Thi Thanh		6851 St. Le Thi Thanh, St. Marrero	
St. Anthony		901 Franklin St, Gretna	
St. Anthony Mission		924 Monroe St, Gretna	"Old" St. Anthony Church, now a mission
St. Anthony		2653 Jean Lafitte Blvd, Lafitte	
St. Cletus		3600 Claire Ave, Gretna	Founded in 1965
St. Joachim		5055 Barataria Blvd, Marrero	Founded in 1985
St. John Paul II		Waggaman	
St. Joseph		610 6th St, Gretna	
St. Joseph the Worker		455 Ames Blvd, Marrero	Founded as a mission in 1924, became a parish in 1957. In 1959, attempts to desegregate the church led to violence. Current church dedicated in 1979
St. Martha		2555 Apollo Dr, Harvey	Founded in 1973, current church dedicated in 2003
Visitation of Our Lady		3500 Ames Blvd, Marrero	Founded as a mission in 1942, current church completed in 1988

=== Deanery VII – Algiers-Plaquemines ===
This list contains parishes in New Orleans and other small communities.

Parish name	Image	Address	description
All Saints		1441 Teche St, New Orleans	Josephite (S.S.J.) Founded in 1919
Holy Name of Mary		500 Eliza St, New Orleans	Founded in 1848 as St. Bartholomew, became Holy Name in 1872. Church dedicated in 1927
Holy Spirit		6201 Stratford Pl, New Orleans	Founded in 1972
Our Lady of Perpetual Help		8968 Hwy. 23, Belle Chasse	
St. Andrew the Apostle		3101 Eton St, New Orleans	
St. Joseph		6450 Kathy Ct, New Orleans	Founded in 1844 for African-American Catholics, current church dedicated in 1892
St. Patrick		28698 Hwy 23, Port Sulphur	

=== Deanery VIII – St. Bernard ===
This list contains parishes in other small communities.

Parish name	Image	Address	description
Assumption of Our Lady		6951 Hwy 39, Braithwaite	Mission of St. Thomas Parish
Our Lady of Lourdes		2621 Colonial Blvd, Violet	Founded in 1916 current church building dedicated 1998.
Our Lady of Prompt Succor		2320 Paris Rd, Chalmette	
St. David		5617 St. Claude Ave, New Orleans	Founded in 1937 for African-American Catholics by the Josephite Order (S.S.J.)
St. Bernard		2805 Bayou Rd, St. Bernard	
St. Thomas		17605 Hwy 15, Pointe a la Hache	

=== Deanery IX – West St. Tammany-Washington ===
This list contains parishes in Mandeville, Covington and other small communities.

Parish name	Image	Address	Description
Holy Family		1318 Bickham Rd, Franklinton	Founded as a mission in 1945, present church dedicated in 1948
Mary Queen of Peace		1501 W. Causeway Appr, Mandeville	Founded in 1988, current church dedicated in 1996
Most Holy Trinity		4465 Hwy 190 E Service Rd, Covington	Founded in 2005, church dedicated in 2016
Our Lady of the Lake		312 Lafitte St, Mandeville	Current church dedicated in 1953
St. Anselm		306 St. Mary St, Madisonville	Created with merger of St. Francis Xavier and St. Catherine Parishes. Church dedicated in 1965
St. Benedict		20370 Smith Rd, Covington	Founded in 1885 for German immigrants, church construction started in 1907
St. Jane de Chantal		7240 Maple St, Abita Springs	
St. John the Baptist		11355 St. John Church Rd, Folsom	Founded as a mission in 1921, present church dedicated in 1941
St. Michael the Archangel		81340 Hwy. 41, Bush	Mission of St. Jane de Chantal Parish
St. Peter		125 E. 19th Ave, Covington	

=== Deanery X – East St. Tammany-Washington ===
This list contains parishes in Slidell and other small communities.

Parish name	Image	Address	Description
Annunciation		517 Ave. B. Bogalusa	Founded as a mission in 1907, became a parish in 1917, present church completed in 1927
Our Lady of Lourdes		400 Westchester Pl, Slidell	Founded as a mission in 1890
Sacred Heart of Jesus		28088 Main St, Lacombe	Founded as St. Cecilia in 1915, current church dedicated as Sacred Heart in 1918
St. Genevieve		58203 Hwy. 433, Slidell	Founded as a mission in 1852, merged with St. Linus Parish in 1968, current church dedicated in 2012
St. John of the Cross		61051 Brier Lake Dr, Lacombe	
St. Luke the Evangelist		910 Cross Gates Blvd, Slidell	Founded in 1982, church dedicated in 1987
St. Margaret Mary		1050 Robert Blvd, Slidell	
Sts. Peter and Paul		66192 St. Mary Dr, Pearl River	Founded as a mission in 1904, church dedicated in 1958, became a parish in 1970.

== Non-parish churches ==
Church name	Image	Address	Description
Center of Jesus the Lord		1236 N. Rampart St, New Orleans	Founded in 1975 for Charismatic Catholics, resides in the former Our Lady of Good Counsel Church
Tulane Catholic		1037 Audubon St, New Orleans	Founded as a Newman Center in 1943. St. Martin de Porres Chapel consecrated in 2019
University of New Orleans Newman Center		2000 Lakeshore Dr, New Orleans	Serves University of New Orleans Catholic community

== Closed churches ==
This list contains churches that have been closed by the archdiocese.

In 2008, the archdiocese released a plan to close 22 churches, with 16 of them in New Orleans. The archdiocese in 2023 announced a plan to close ten percent of the remaining parishes.

Church name	Image	Location	Description
Annunciation		Marais St, New Orleans	By 2011 the archdiocese listed for sale the church, rectory, and parish hall.
Ave Maria		New Orleans	Destroyed by the 1915 New Orleans hurricane. Dedicated in 1912.
Blessed Sacrament		5030 Constance Street, New Orleans	Closed in 2008, parish merged with St. Joan of Arc Parish
Epiphany of Our Lord		New Orleans	Closed in 2008, parish merged with Corpus Christi Parish. Opened in 1948.
Holy Guardian Angels		Bridge City	Closed in 2008, parish merged with Our Lady of Prompt Succor Parish
Holy Trinity		725 Saint Ferdinand St, New Orleans	Closed in 1997, now operates as the Marigny Opera House
Immaculate Heart of Mary		6300 Pines Blvd, New Orleans	Closed in 2008, parish moved to St. Maria Goretti Parish.
Incarnate Word		New Orleans	Closed in 2008. parish moved to Mater Dolorosa Parish
Infant Jesus of Prague		Harvey	Merged with St. Martha Parish in 2008
Nativity of Our Lord		Kenner	Closed in 2008, parish moved to St. Elizabeth Ann Seton Parish
Notre Dame de Bon Secours		900 block of Jackson Avenue, New Orleans	Built 1858; demolished after damage from the Great Hurricane of 1915.
Our Lady of the Angels		139 Herman St, Waggaman	Closed in 2024, parish moved to St. John Paul II Parish.
Our Lady of Good Counsel		1307 Louisiana Ave, New Orleans	Closed in 2008, parish moved to St. Stephen Parish.
Our Lady of Good Harbor		Buras	Closed in 2008, parish moved to St. Patrick Church. Its parish school was the first school to be racially desegregated by the archdiocese, prompting boycotts and vandalism in the 1960s.
Our Lady of Lourdes, New Orleans		Napoleon Avenue, New Orleans	Vacant since Hurricane Katrina in 2005; officially closed in 2008, parish moved to St. Matthias Parish. Dedicated in 1957
(Old) Our Lady of Lourdes, Violet		6301 E St Bernard Hwy, Violet, Louisiana	
Our Lady Star of the Sea		1835 St. Roch Ave, New Orleans	Closed in 2026, parish moved to St. Josephine Bakhita Parish
Sacred Heart of Jesus		Canal St, New Orleans	Closed in 2008, parish moved to St. Anthony of Padua Parish. In 1901, Louis Armstrong was christened here.
San Pedro Pescador		Reggio	Closed in 2008, parish moved to St. Bernard Parish.
St. Alphonsus		2029 Constance St, New Orleans	Merged with St. Mary's Assumption. Building now a community center.
St. Anthony		Gretna	Closed in 2008, parish moved to Holy Name of Mary Parish.
St. Anthony		120 Dearmas Ln,Venice	
St. Bonaventure		329 S. Jamie Blvd, Avondale	Closed in 2024, parish moved to St. John Paul II Parish. Founded in 1965
St. Brigid		13435 Granville St, New Orleans	Closed in 2008, parish moved to Mary, Queen of Vietnam Parish. Founded in 1977.
St. Cecilia		1015 France at Rampart Street, Bywater, New Orleans	Current building dedicated 1923; closed in 2000, building repurposed for Catholic Charities USA
St. Elizabeth Ann Seton		4335 Sal Lentini Pkwy, Kenner	Closed in 2008, parish merged with Nativity of Our Lord Parish
St. Frances Xavier Cabrini		5500 Paris Ave, New Orleans	Severely damaged in Hurricane Katrina levee failure disaster in 2005; officially closed in 2008, parish merged into Transfiguration parish.
St. Francis de Sales		2205 Second Street, New Orleans	Closed in 2008, parish merged with Holy Ghost Parish.
St. Gabriel the Archangel		4700 Pineda Street, New Orleans	Closed in 2024, parish moved to Blessed Trinity Parish. Founded in 1954, church dedicated in 1966
St. Gertrude the Great		17292 LA Hwy 631, Des Allemands	Closed in 2024, parish went to St. Michael the Archangel
St. Henry		New Orleans	Closed in 2008. Parishioners occupied the church until their removal by police. Parish moved to St. Stephen Parish.
St. James Major		3736 Gentilly Blvd, New Orleans	Closed in 2024, parish moved to St. Martin de Porres Parish. Originally founded in 1820, church dedicated in 1952
St. John the Baptist		New Orleans	Closed in 2006, parish went to St. Patrick Parish, which still uses this church. Originally founded and church dedicated in 1851
St. John the Baptist		15405 Hwy. 90, Paradis	Closed in 2024, parish went to St. Michael the Archangel
St. John Bosco		2114 Oakmere Dr, Harvey	Closed in 2024. Church dedicated in 1982, became a parish in 1983
St. Julian Eymard		New Orleans	Closed in 2008, parish merged with Holy Name of Mary Parish.
St. Lawrence the Martyr		Metairie	Closed in 2008, parish merged with Our Lady of Divine Providence Parish
St. Louise Marillac		6800 Patricia St, Arabi	Closed in 2008, parish merged with Our Lady of Prompt Succor Parish Demolished in 2009.
St. Mark		Chalmette	Closed in 2008, parish merged with Our Lady of Prompt Succor Parish.
St. Mary		New Orleans	Closed in 2008, parish moved to St. Louis Cathedral Parish. St. Mary is located in the historic Old Ursuline Convent complex.
St. Matthias		4230 South Broad New Orleans	Parish officially closed in 2008, parish moved to Blessed Trinity parish, which uses this same church building. Originally founded in 1920, church dedicated in 1921
St. Maurice		New Orleans	Vacant since damage in the levee failure disaster in 2005, officially closed in 2008, parish moved to St. David Parish.
St. Monica		2327 South Galvez Street, New Orleans	Closed in 2008, parish moved to St. Matthias Church
St. Philip the Apostle		3304 Metropolitan Street, New Orleans	Closed in 2005, parish moved to St. Mary of the Angels. Founded in 1951, church dedicated in 1967
St. Pius X		8151 Barataria Blvd, Crown Point	Merged with St. Anthony Parish in 2008
St. Raphael		New Orleans	Merged with St. Frances Cabrini Parish in 2008
St. Raymond			Closed in 2008, parish moved to St. Raymond-St. Leo the Great Parish. Church dedicated in 1927 and became a parish in 1929
St. Robert Bellarmine		815 Badger Dr,Arabi	Merged with Our Lady of Prompt Succor.
St. Rosalie		600 2nd Ave, Harvey	Closed in 2024
St. Rose of Lima		2541 Bayou Rd, New Orleans	Unused since Hurricane Katrina in 2005; officially closed in 2008. Founded in 1858. Now serves as the André Cailloux Center for Performing Arts and Cultural Justice.
St. Simon Peter		7600 Gannon Road, New Orleans	Unused since Hurricane Katrina in 2005, officially closed in 2008, parish moved to St. Maria Goretti Parish
St. Theresa of Avila		1404 Erato St.	Closed in 2024
St. Theresa of the Child Jesus		8601 Palmetto Street, New Orleans	Church of Saint Theresa of Lisieux, commonly called Saint Theresa Little Flower Church locally. Flooded in 2005, officially closed in 2006, parish moved to Incarnate Word Parish. Founded in 1929, church dedicated in 1949 As of 2025, building repurposed as City of Love Full Gospel Church.
St. Vincent de Paul		3053 Dauphine, New Orleans	Merged in 2001 with other congregations to become Blessed Francis Seelos Parish. Originally founded in 1830s, church dedicated in 1840
