= Robert Parker (singer) =

American R&B singer (1930–2020)

- Born: October 14, 1930; Mobile, Alabama, U.S.
- Origin: New Orleans, Louisiana, U.S
- Died: January 19, 2020 (aged 89) Roseland, Louisiana, U. S.
- Genres: R&B
- Occupations: Singer; songwriter
- Years active: 1949–2009
- Labels: Ron, Imperial, Nola, Island

Robert Parker (October 14, 1930 – January 19, 2020) was an American R&B singer. His sole hit was "Barefootin'" (1966), and he is considered a one-hit wonder.

== Life and career ==
Robert Parker, Jr. was born in Mobile, Alabama, to Robert and Leana Parker. He grew up in New Orleans, Louisiana, and started his career as a saxophonist, playing with Professor Longhair on his hit "Mardi Gras in New Orleans" in 1949.

During the 1950s, Parker played alto and tenor saxophone with many of the most popular New Orleans performers, appearing on records by Eddie Bo, Huey "Piano" Smith, Earl King, James Booker, Ernie K-Doe, Tommy Ridgley, Fats Domino and others in New Orleans, and backed up visiting R&B artists including Solomon Burke, Lloyd Price, Jerry Butler, and Otis Redding.

By 1958, he had started recording solo, having a local hit with the instrumental "All Nite Long" a year later. In 1965 he signed for Nola Records, and teaming up with producer Wardell Quezergue had his biggest hit with "Barefootin' ", which he had written. It sold over one million copies, made the pop charts in Britain and elsewhere, and was awarded a gold disc by the RIAA. In 1967, he had another minor R&B hit with "Tip Toe" (no.48, R&B chart). Although he continued to record, he failed to repeat his success in terms of sales, and his recording career effectively ended in the mid 1970s. However, he continued to perform and tour for many more years, remaining especially popular in the UK.

In April 2007, in recognition of his contributions to Louisiana and national music, Parker was inducted into the Louisiana Music Hall of Fame. On July 19, 2009, he performed "Barefootin'" and "Where the Action Is" in a 'Tribute to Wardell Quezergue', a concert at Alice Tully Hall at the Lincoln Center in New York.

Parker died on January 19, 2020, at his home in Roseland, Louisiana, at the age of 89 of natural causes.

== Discography ==
=== Studio albums ===
- Barefootin' (1966) – No. 16 Billboard Top R&B/Hip-Hop Albums

=== Compilation albums ===
- Get Ta Steppin' (1987)
- Barefootin' Plus 13 More Golden Classics (1987)
- The Wardell Quezerque Sessions (2002)
- An Introduction to Robert Parker (2006)

=== Singles ===
Year	Single	Chart Positions		
Year	Single	UK	US Hot 100/ Bubbling Under	US R&B/ Hip-Hop
1958	"June Teen" b/w "Lawdy Miss Clawdy"	—	—	—
1959	"All Nite Long (Part 1)" b/w "All Nite Long (Part 2)"	—	113	—
1960	"Walkin'" b/w "Across the Track"	—	—	—
1962	"Mash Potatoes All Night Long" b/w "Twistin' Out in Space"	—	—	—
1962	"You're Looking Good" b/w "Little Things Mean a Lot"	—	—	—
1963	"Please Forgive Me" b/w "You Got It"	—	—	—
1963	"The Laughing Monkey" b/w "Let's Do the Thing" (Released as 'Robert Parker & Band')	—	—	—
1966	"Barefootin'" b/w "Let's Go Baby (Where the Action Is)"	24	7	2
1966	"The Scratch" b/w "Happy Feet"	—	124	—
1966	"Tip Toe" b/w "Soul Kind of Loving"	—	83	48
1966	"A Letter to Santa" b/w "C. C. Rider"	—	—	—
1967	"Yak Yak Yak" b/w "Secret Service (Makes Me Nervous)"	—	—	—
1967	"Everybody's Hip-Huggin'" b/w "Foxy Mama"	—	—	—
1967	"I Caught You in a Lie" b/w "Holdin' Out"	—	—	—
1968	"Soul Sister" b/w "Barefootin' Boogaloo"	—	—	—
1968	"Bow Legs" b/w "Boss Lovin'"	—	—	—
1968	"Funky Soul Train" b/w "Robert and W.Q's Train"	—	—	—
1969	"You Shakin' Things Up" b/w "You See Me"	—	—	—
1970	"The Hiccup" b/w "Rockin' Pneumonia"	—	—	—
1970	"You See Me" b/w "You Shakin' Things Up" (Re-release with sides reversed)	—	—	—
1972	"Barefootin'" b/w "Shootin' the Grease" (by Jesse Gresham Plus 3)	—	—	—
1974	"Get Ta Steppin'" b/w "Get Right on Down"	—	—	—
1974	"Barefootin'" b/w "I Caught You in a Lie" (UK-only release)	—	—	—
1975	"Give Me the Country Side of Life" b/w "It's Hard But It's Fair"	—	—	—
1976	"A Little Bit of Something (Is Better Than a Whole Lot of Nothing" b/w "Better Luck in the Summer"	—	—	—
1987	"Barefootin'" b/w "Let's Go Baby (Where the Action Is)" (Re-release)	90	—	—

== See also ==
- List of 1960's one-hit wonders in the US
