= Hard River to Cross =

Studio album by Earl King
- Released: May 4, 1993
- Genre: Blues
- Label: Black Top
- Producer: Hammond Scott

Earl King chronology
Sexual Telepathy (1990)	Hard River to Cross (1993)	Earl's Pearls: The Very Best of Earl King 1955–1960 (1997)

Hard River to Cross is an album by the American musician Earl King, released on May 4, 1993. He supported it with a North American tour.

== Production ==
The album was produced by Hammond Scott. George Porter Jr. played bass and Snooks Eaglin contributed on guitar. King wrote the songs, some of which were decades old, on guitar and piano. The horn charts were arranged by Mark Kazanoff. "It Hurts to Love Someone" is a cover of the Guitar Slim song; Slim had been a mentor to King. "You Better Know" advises against getting married. "Big Foot" is a narrative about a party-seeking beast venturing from the bayou to New Orleans. "Handy Wrap" is about a man who is unhappy in his mundane romantic relationship.

== Critical reception ==
Professional ratings
Review scores
Source	Rating
All Music Guide to the Blues	5/5 stars
MusicHound Blues: The Essential Album Guide	5/5 stars
New York Daily News	3/4 stars
Orlando Sentinel	4/5 stars
The Rolling Stone Jazz & Blues Album Guide	4/5 stars
San Antonio Express-News	3.5/4 stars
The Virgin Encyclopedia of the Blues	3/5 stars

Newsday stated, "King has a crisp, clean disciplined approach to solos: He stings while the rhythm section swings." The Washington Post noted "King's soulful voice and sometimes sinuous, sometimes stinging guitar work". The Orlando Sentinel said that "King's jumping blues have a distinctive spicy, New Orleans feel, but what really sets King apart is his humorous and inventive songwriting." The Chicago Tribune listed Hard River to Cross as the second best blues album of 1993.

== Track listing ==
No.	Title	Length
1.	"Medieval Days"
2.	"Seduction"
3.	"Hard River to Cross"
4.	"Clairvoyant Lady"
5.	"It Hurts to Love Someone"
6.	"No City Like New Orleans"
7.	"You Better Know"
8.	"Big Foot"
9.	"Your Love Means More to Me Than Gold"
10.	"I'm Still Holding On"
11.	"Handy Wrap"
12.	"Love Can Save the World"
