= Expeditus =

Christian Martyr

Saint Expeditus
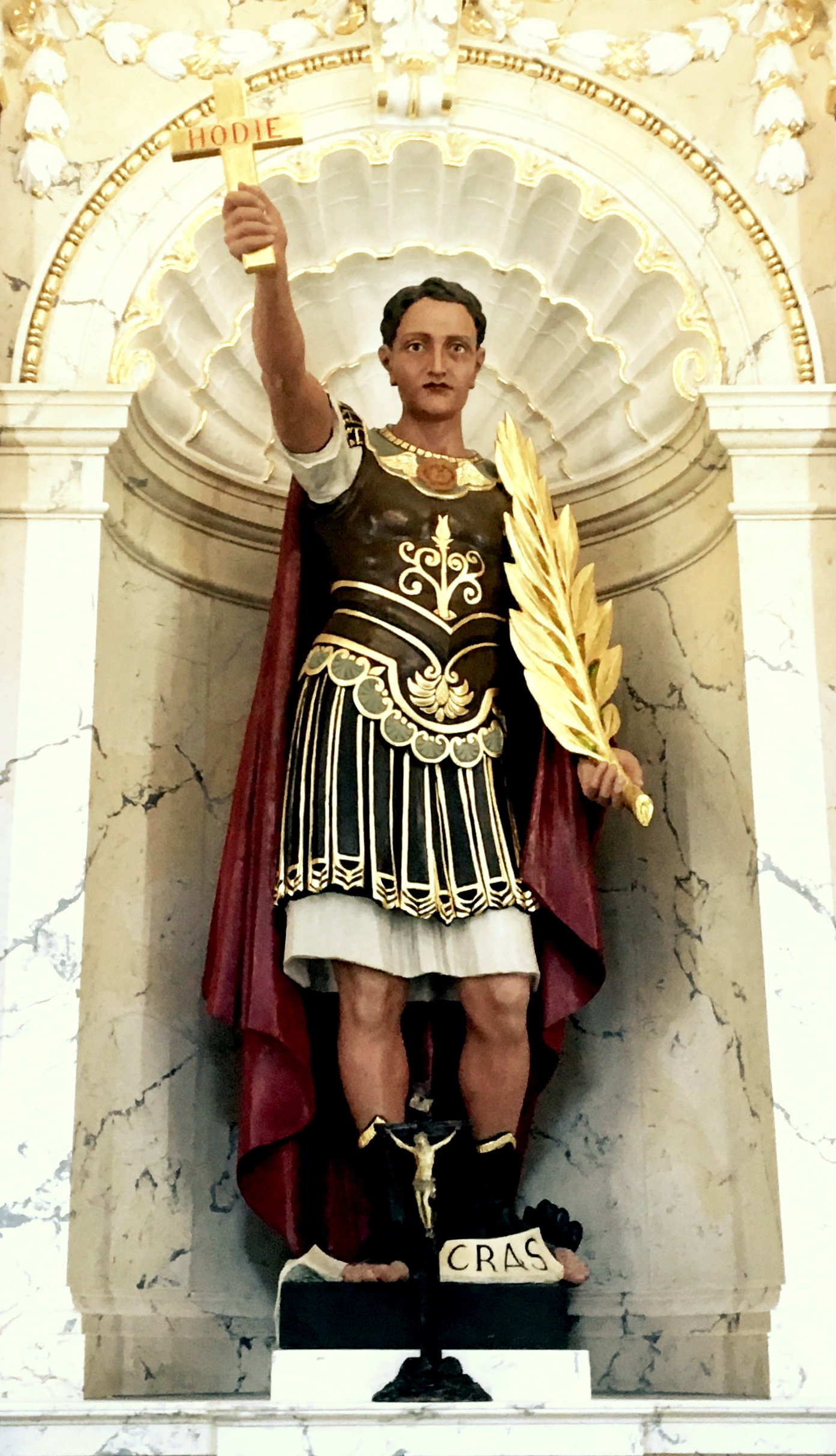
- Expeditus with his typical iconographical attributes.

Martyr
- Born: 261; Regensburg, Raetia, Germany
- Died: 303; Melitene, Armenia Minor, Roman Empire (modern-day Malatya, Turkey)
- Venerated in: Catholic Church; Lutheranism; Oriental Orthodox Churches
- Canonized: Pre-Congregation
- Feast: 19 April
- Attributes: Depicted as a Roman centurion, holding a palm leaf in his left hand, and raising a cross with the word hodie (today) on it in his right hand. His right foot is stepping on a crow, which is speaking the word "cras" (tomorrow).
- Patronage: emergencies; expeditious solutions; against procrastination; merchants; revolutionaries; navigators

Expeditus (died 303), also known as Expedite, was said to have been a Roman centurion in Armenia who was martyred around April 303 in what is now Turkey, for converting to Christianity. Considered the patron saint of urgent causes, he is also known as the saint of time; he was commemorated by the Catholic Church on 19 April.

== Hagiography ==
Information concerning Expeditus is found in the Hieronymian Martyrology, where he appears as one of six Roman soldiers said to have been executed at Melitene during the Diocletianic Persecution. If he was stationed at Melitene at the beginning of the fourth century, he would likely have been a member of the Legio XII Fulminata.

His cult was already developed in Turin, Italy, in the Middle Ages. Given that "Expeditus" is Latin for a soldier without marching pack, i.e. a soldier with light equipment, this saint may be an anonymous individual known by his profession. He was mentioned briefly in 1675 in the Acta sanctorum volume for April. Expeditus was included in martyrologies in Italy before 1781.

== Historicity ==
According to hagiographical scholar Hippolyte Delehaye, the word "Expeditus" is a misreading of "Elpidius". His name was struck off the list of martyrs by Pope Pius X in 1905, and his image was banned from churches, without success.

== Legends ==
According to tradition, Expeditus was a Roman centurion in Armenia who became a Christian and was beheaded during the Diocletian Persecution in AD 303. The day he decided to become a Christian, the Devil took the form of a crow (a snake in some versions of the legend) and told him to defer his conversion until the next day. Expeditus stamped on the bird and killed it, declaring, "I'll be a Christian today!"

Various stories circulated about the origin of the cultus of Expeditus. One states that it began when a package marked expedite (meaning 'be ready' or alternately 'loosen') arrived with unidentified relics or statues. The recipients assumed that the statuary or relics belonged to an Expeditus, and so veneration began. Such an account is set in France in 1781. A case containing the relics of a saint, who was formerly buried in the Denfert-Rochereau catacombs of Paris, was delivered at a convent in the city. The senders had written expédit on the case, to ensure fast delivery of the remains. The nuns assumed that "Expédit" was the name of a martyr, and prayed for his intercession. When their prayers were answered, veneration spread rapidly through France and on to other Roman Catholic countries.

Another version of the story takes place in New Orleans, Louisiana, which was strongly influenced by French Catholic culture through the colonial period. This account says that Our Lady of Guadalupe Chapel (New Orleans) received a large shipment of statues of various saints, and that one case lacked an identifying label. It was labeled "Expedite" (Expédit in French), so the residents assumed that must be the saint's name. The church has a statue of Expéditus, who still figures prominently in Louisiana Creole folklore and is revered through amulets, flowers, candles, and intercessory prayers.

== Veneration ==
His feast of April 19 is widely celebrated. Expedite is venerated in Europe and strongly in Latin America. Brazil has ceremonies in São Paulo and crowds attending ceremonies to mark his April 19 feast day can reach in the hundreds of thousands. Expedite is not mentioned in the Menaion, Prologue, or Synaxarion and therefore not officially recognized as a saint in the Eastern Orthodox Church.

== Patronage ==
At first, he was invoked for urgent causes. In 1781 Pope Pius VI proclaimed him protector of merchants and seafarers. There was a tradition that Expeditus could be called upon to help settle overly long legal cases. Expeditus is the patron saint of Acireale, Sicily.

=== Iconographical depiction ===
Expeditus' typical depiction in artwork is as a young Roman centurion. The soldier is squashing a crow beneath his right foot and bearing a clock in early images. Later depictions have Expeditus holding a cross, inscribed with the Latin word hodie ("today"). A banderole with the word cras ("tomorrow" in Latin) emerges from the crow's mouth.

== Cultus ==
=== Churches ===
- Buenos Aires, Argentina

=== Chile ===
Veneration in Chile is said to have begun when a devotee of Expeditus (or locally in Spanish, San Expedito) brought an image of him to Viña del Mar, one of the most popular beach cities of Chile. She petitioned some local priests for help to have a small church built for him. It is said that local authorities initially rejected the idea, but the priests and the devout lady prayed to Expeditus, and in less than nine days they had the approval. Since then, the cult of San Expedito has become increasingly popular in Chile; from rich to poor, people pray novenas to him. The shrine in the Reñaca sector of Viña is a rather popular pilgrimage site, especially during summer.

Himnos mil al glorioso Expedito,
que su sangre en la Armenia vertió,
cuyo nombre en el cielo fue escrito,
y de mártir el laurel alcanzó.
—Himno a San Expedito

A thousand hymns to glorious Expeditus,
Who shed his blood in Armenia,
Whose name was written in heaven,
And gained the laurel of martyrdom.
—Hymn to Saint Expeditus

=== Réunion Island ===
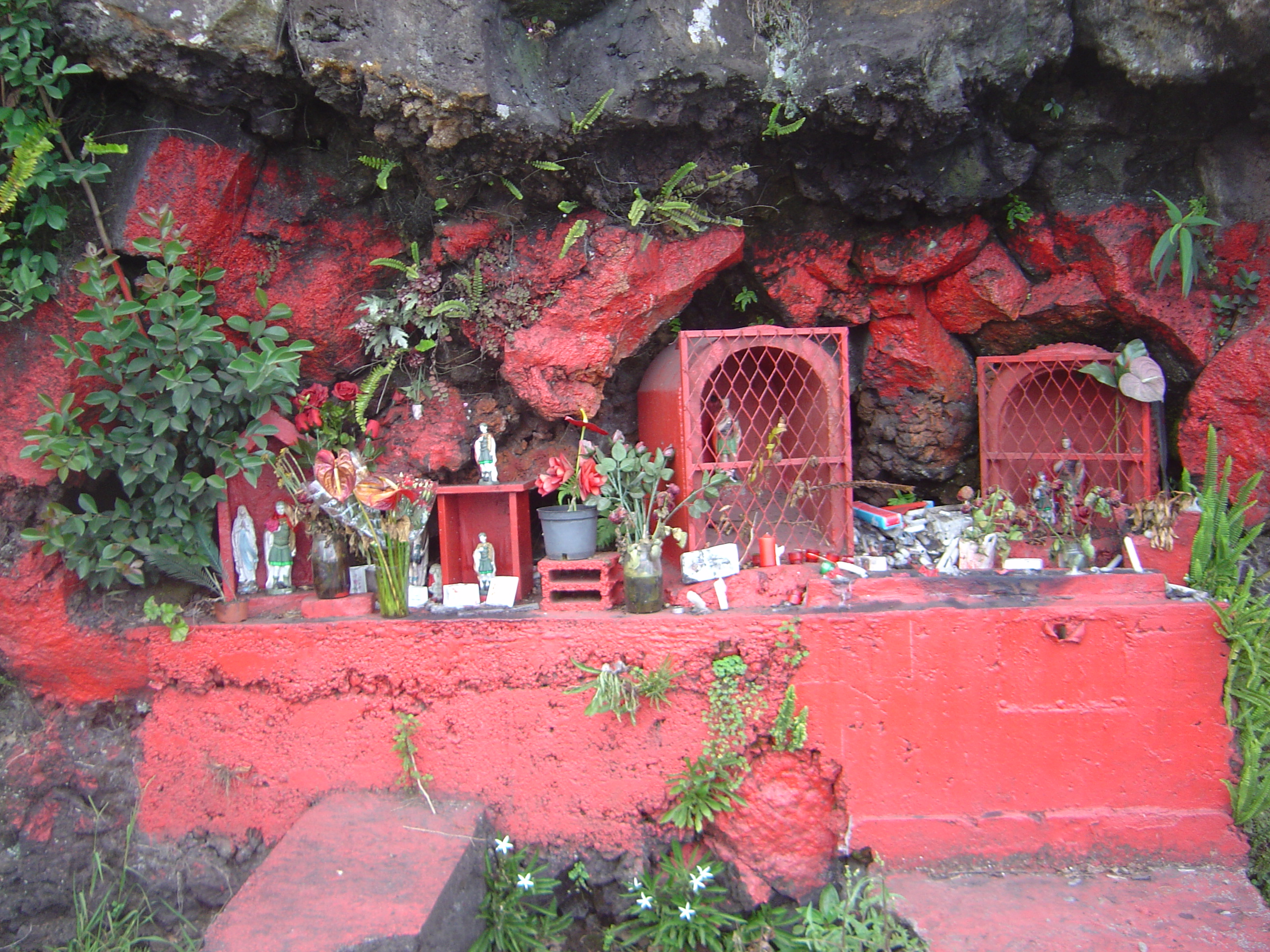
Roadside altars dedicated to Expédit are common in Réunion and always painted red.

Expédit has a significant folk following on the French island of Réunion off the east coast of Africa in the Indian Ocean. Stories about the origin of his veneration follow the typical formula: a mysterious parcel marked with expedit arrived as an aid to instill pious virtues in the people. Another version says that Expédit acquired his name through his help in placing vengeful curses. Decapitated statues of the saint are often found, the defacement inflicted in anger for a request not carried out, or in order to break an existing curse.

Road-side altars dedicated to Expédit can be as small as a box containing a small statue of the saint, or as large as a hut, containing multiple statues, candles, and flowers. In all cases, these altars are painted a bright red. Also common are ex-votos thanking Expédit for wishes granted and favors received.

In Réunion, the cult of Saint Expédit has been syncretic, associating him with the goddess Kali, with Roman Catholicism absorbing other beliefs from Madagascar or India. Expédit is a popular saint, revered by Reunionnais regardless of age or religion. As the worship of Expédit is officially considered taboo, people do not generally visit the altars in the open. But, the altars are widespread on the island and obviously well-tended, showing that the cult is active.
