= Wardell Quezergue =

American composer, producer (1930–2011)

Wardell Quezergue, Sr.
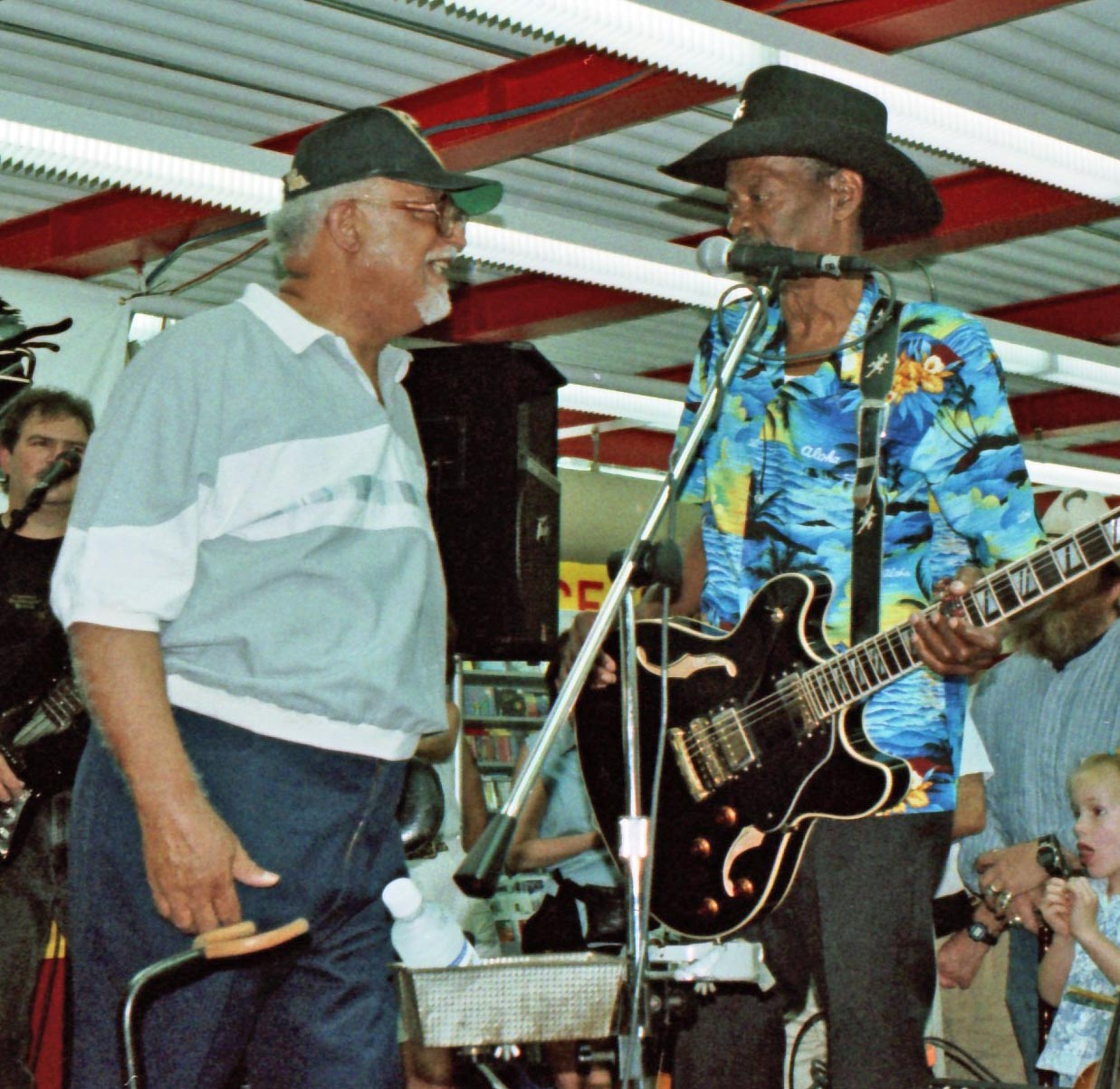
- Quezergue (left) greeting Clarence "Gatemouth" Brown, New Orleans, 1997

Background information
- Born: Wardell Joseph Quezergue; March 12, 1930; New Orleans, Louisiana
- Died: September 6, 2011 (aged 81) New Orleans, Louisiana
- Genres: Jazz, rhythm and blues, blues, big band, classical
- Occupations: Composer, producer, arranger, conductor, bandleader
- Years active: 1940s–2011
- Labels: Nola, Malaco, and others

Wardell Joseph Quezergue (/kəˈzɛər/ kə-ZAIR; March 12, 1930 – September 6, 2011) was an American composer, arranger, record producer and bandleader, known among New Orleans musicians as the "Creole Beethoven". Steeped in jazz, he was an influential musician whose work shaped the sound of New Orleans rhythm and blues, funk and pop music. His role as an arranger and producer kept him out of the spotlight and enabled him to enhance the careers of many. He was a staple of the New Orleans music scene and the recipient of an honorary doctorate in music.

== Early life ==
Quezergue was born in the Seventh Ward of New Orleans into a musical family of creole descent. His father Sidney Quezergue Sr. played guitar and his mother Violetta Guimont played clarinet. His older brothers, Sidney Jr. and Leo, were jazz musicians. Sidney played the trumpet and Leo played the drums. The family played together on Sundays. Quezergue had no formal music training. He was influenced by Louis Armstrong, Harry James and Dizzy Gillespie. As a teenager he played the trumpet professionally and started to compose.

== Musical career ==
=== 1940s–1950s ===
In late 1940s Quezergue played in Dave Bartholomew's band. In 1951 he was drafted into the army and served as an army musician stationed in Japan during the Korean War. He credits the army and the army musicians for his professional education. He met and married his wife Yoshi Tamaki in Japan. After returning to New Orleans he studied at the Gateway School of Music. He started to get work by rearranging popular hits for the local music market. He emerged as a bandleader in his own right in the mid-1950s with his band the Royal Dukes of Rhythm, and later with Wardell and the Sultans in the late 1950s. He taught music and arranged for well-known acts. His bands backed a variety of artists including Otis Redding. He was the recording secretary and lifelong member of the New Orleans Negro Musicians Union.

Quezergue did not have a signature musical style. He approached each composition and each project individually. He avoided listening to hit songs on the radio because he thought it would bias his creativity. In the absence of a piano he would use a tuning fork to establish the pitch. In arranging, his first consideration was the bassline. He associated the melody of the bassline with groove and energy. He particularly specialized in arranging horn charts. In describing his role as an arranger, he said he applied New Orleans jazz to other styles of music.

=== 1960s–1970s ===
In the early 1960s Quezergue arranged for bandleader Dave Bartholomew at Imperial Records. He worked on releases by Fats Domino, Earl King and others, including King's signature song "Trick Bag" and Professor Longhair's carnival standard "Big Chief". He did several stage arrangements for Motown acts including Stevie Wonder.

In 1962 Quezergue formed Nola Records. In 1964 he co-wrote drummer Smokey Johnson's "It Ain't My Fault", an instrumental track which became a New Orleans funk standard. Robert Parker's "Barefootin'" from the label reached number two on the R&B chart. Other artists on the label included Eddie Bo and Willie Tee. Later he signed a production deal with Malaco Records of Jackson, Mississippi, and recorded King Floyd's "Groove Me" and Jean Knight's "Mr. Big Stuff" in a single week. Both songs reached number one on the R&B chart. Initially major labels, including Stax and Atlantic, had rejected the songs as uncommercial, so Malaco released "Groove Me" on its own label, Chimneyville Records. The song became King Floyd's biggest hit. It has been covered by artists as diverse as Etta James and Tom Petty. Stax eventually released "Mr. Big Stuff" and it became the biggest-selling release of the label reaching double platinum, outselling Otis Redding, Sam and Dave and other Stax acts. He also arranged two songs for The Dixie Cups, "Iko Iko" and "Chapel of Love" which reached number one on the Pop chart. By this time Quezergue was so integrated in the New Orleans music scene that he declined a liberal offer to join Atlantic Records.

As a result of his success, Quezergue's skills and Malaco studio were in demand in the 1970s and were used by artists as diverse as Paul Simon, Willie Nelson and B.B. King. In 1975 he arranged Dorothy Moore's "Misty Blue" which crossed over and reached number three on the Pop chart. He also worked with G.C. Cameron, former lead singer of the Spinners, the Pointer Sisters and many more. A twenty-track compilation album of Quezergue's lesser-known works from this era, titled Strung Out, was released in 2004.

=== 1980s–2010s ===
In 1980s Quezergue worked with the Neville Brothers. In 1992 he produced and arranged Dr. John's Grammy Award–winning album Goin' Back to New Orleans. In late 1990s he produced horn arrangements for two big band albums by Clarence "Gatemouth" Brown. In 2000 he released a classical composition titled A Creole Mass. The composition is a tribute to the fallen soldier who replaced Quezergue in combat decades earlier during the Korean War. In 2003 Quezergue produced an album for soul singer-songwriter Will Porter. The album, titled Happy, was recognized as best produced CD of the year by the New York Blues & Jazz Society. The album featured Billy Preston, guitarist Leo Nocentelli and the Louisiana Philharmonic Strings.

In 2005, by then legally blind, Quezergue lost his belongings and musical scores in the aftermath of Hurricane Katrina. The following year benefit concerts were held on his behalf, led by Dr. John with support from other leading musicians including REM's Mike Mills.

In 2009 Quezergue received an honorary doctorate in music from Loyola University New Orleans for his commitment to public service and the arts. He was known for enhancing the careers of others, dedication to teaching, and the development of New Orleans' distinct horn sound. The same year a tribute to him was staged at Lincoln Center's Alice Tully Hall. The concept of the show started with 'Dr. Ike' Padnos and the Ponderosa Stomp crew. A nine-piece band was assembled from New Orleans to accompany Dr. John, Robert Parker, Jean Knight and the Dixie Cups. By then a veteran arranger in his later years, Quezergue showed his longevity by conducting the concert. Also in 2009 he released an album titled Music for Children Ages 3 to 103. The twelve-track album was funded by the Jazz Foundation of America.

In 2010 Quezergue was inducted into the Louisiana Music Hall of Fame. In 2011 he finished two works: The Passion, and an album by Will Porter. The Passion, Death, and Resurrection of Jesus Christ is a classical composition based on the religious theme of resurrection. It was composed over a two-year period. In August 2011 Quezergue approved final mixes of Will Porter's album Tick Tock Tick. The album featured Dr. John, Bettye LaVette, guitarist Leo Nocentelli, bassist Jimmy Haslip, drummer Bernard "Bunchy" Johnson and the Louisiana Philharmonic Strings.

== Personal life and death ==
Quezergue was Catholic. He died on September 6, 2011, in New Orleans at age 81. His wife of 60 years, Yoshi Tamaki, predeceased him in May 2011. The couple are survived by eight daughters and five sons, including bassist Brian Quezergue.

== Quotations ==
- In a 2004 interview with OffBeat, Quezergue said: "Whenever I arrange the first thing that comes to my mind is the bass part. From the bass you get the groove, you get the bottom of what you want to do from the bass. A good drum player will fill in the gaps. That's the root. But it's always the melodic line with the bass that starts me off with everything. It's all about energy."
- In a 2010 interview with NPR, Quezergue said: "Arrangement, to me, has to be part of the song itself, as if the two were made for each other at the moment that the writer wrote the song, and it should fit like a glove."

== Classical compositions ==
- A Creole Mass – premiered and recorded at St. Louis Cathedral in 2000.
- The Passion, Death, and Resurrection of Jesus Christ – premiered and recorded at Corpus Christi-Epiphany Church in 2013.
