= Nola Records =

- Founded: 1963
- Founder: Wardell Quezergue, Clint Scott, Ulis Gaines
- Defunct: 1968
- Status: Defunct
- Genre: R&B
- Country of origin: United States
- Location: New Orleans, Louisiana

Nola Records was an American independent record label based in New Orleans.

== Overview ==
The label was established in mid-1963 by composer and bandleader, Wardell Quezergue along with music producers Clint Scott and Ulis Gaines. The name ‘’’Nola’’’ is short for New Orleans, Louisiana which is the term commonly used to describe the City. Bonatemp Records and Hot Line Records were its subsidiary labels.

Nola recorded and released records under production of Quezergue. The first record from the label that gathered attention was "It Ain't My Fault", a tune by session drummer Joe “Smokey” Johnson. This record was leased to Vee-Jay Records for national distribution.

The label's biggest hit was “Barefootin’” by Robert Parker released in 1966 which climbed to No. 7 in the Billboard Hot 100 and No. 2 in the Billboard R&B chart.

Other artists on the label included Curley Moore (“Soul Train”), Willie Tee (“Teasin’ You”), Earl King ("Poor Sam" on Nola's subsidiary label, Hot Line), and Eddie Bo.
