= Barefootin' (song) =

1966 single by Robert Parker

Single by Robert Parker

from the album Barefootin'
- B-side: "Let's Go Baby (Where the Action Is)"
- Released: 1966
- Genre: R&B
- Length: 2:33
- Label: Nola (USA); Island (UK); EMI Columbia (France); Polydor (Netherlands)
- Songwriter: Robert Parker
- Producers: Whurley Burley Productions, arranged by Wardell Quezergue

Audio
- "Barefootin'" on YouTube

"Barefootin'" is a 1966 song written and performed by Robert Parker. "Barefootin'" was arranged and produced by Wardell Quezergue in 1965. Parker's record label, Nola Records, claimed that the record sold over one million copies.

== Chart performance ==
The song reached No.2 on the U.S. Hot Rhythm & Blues Singles chart and No.7 on the Billboard Hot 100. It also peaked at No.11 on the Cash Box Top 100 in June 1966. Outside the US, the track reached No.7 in Canada in June 1966 and No.24 in the UK Singles Chart in September 1966.

== Other versions ==
In Canada, Larry Lee & the Leesures had a hit version in 1967. In 1977, Barefoot Jerry covered the song on the album of the same name. In 1987 a claymation music video was produced by Aardman Animations taking place in outer space with aliens singing. Aardman Animations were approached by Charly Records who owned the back catalog rights to many classic R&B tracks. In the late '80s, classic R&B charted at the lower 100 on the charts and sometimes the owner would spend some marketing money on a song hoping to kick it into the top 20.

The song is included as a full-length performance by Walter "Wolfman" Washington and house band in the 2005 documentary film Make It Funky!, which presents a history of New Orleans music and its influence on rhythm and blues, rock and roll, funk and jazz.

It was covered on the 1989 album Southern Star by the American country music band Alabama. Lead vocals were sung by the bands lead guitarist/fiddler Jeff Cook.

It was covered on Joanie Bartels' 1991 album, "Dancin' Magic".

It was covered by the Kidsongs kids in their 1998 video, "I Can Dance!"

It was included on the soundtrack album of the 2006 film Hoot by Jimmy Buffett and Alan Jackson, on the MCA label.

It was covered by the Monarchs Blues Band, a band with members from North Wales and Cheshire, following their win on the "One More Dream" contest, run by Boom Radio in association with Ambassador Cruise Line to give a band, group or artist another shot at fame, in 2026. The cover version was recorded at AIR Studios, with Mike Batt and Haydn Bendall.
