= Sexual Telepathy =

Studio album by Earl King
- Released: 1990
- Genre: Blues, R&B
- Label: Black Top

Earl King chronology
Glazed (1986)	Sexual Telepathy (1990)	Hard River to Cross (1993)

Sexual Telepathy is an album by the American musician Earl King, released in 1990. King supported the album with a North American tour.

== Production ==
King wrote eight new songs for the album and rerecorded three older ones. He worked with three bands on Sexual Telepathy: the Black Top All-Stars, Ronnie Earl and the Broadcasters, and the house band at Antone's. Pianist Snooks Eaglin and King swapped instruments on "Love Is the Way of Life", with Eaglin playing guitar. George Porter Jr. played bass on some tracks; the Kamikaze Horns also contributed. Many of the songs originated from King's list of 500 song titles. King also recorded "Life's Ups and Downs" during the Sexual Telepathy sessions.

== Critical reception ==
Professional ratings
Review scores
Source	Rating
AllMusic	4.5/5 stars
The Encyclopedia of Popular Music	4/5 stars
MusicHound Blues: The Essential Album Guide	4.5/5 stars

USA Today wrote that the songs "radiate warmth and humor, from the ribald title track to a silly but endearing /Happy Little Nobody's Waggy Tail Dog'." The Washington Post stated that, "from the intense romanticism of the heartbreak ballad, 'A Weary Silent Night', to the exuberant sexiness of the title tune, this is one of the year's best."

The St. Petersburg Times opined that King "displays a subtle mastery of the guitar... Like his songs, his playing, while not flashy, is quirky, sinuous and ingratiating." The Sun-Sentinel called the album "a compelling collection of pithy, down-home paeans propelled by locomotive r&b rumblings and King's stirring delivery."

AllMusic wrote: "Reunited with a more sympathetic New Orleans rhythm section ... and a funkier horn section, King excelled handsomely on this uncommonly strong outing."

== Track listing ==
No.	Title	Length
1.	"Old Mr. Bad Luck"
2.	"I'll Take You Back Home"
3.	"A Weary Silent Night"
4.	"Time for the Sun to Rise"
5.	"No One More for the Road"
6.	"Going Public"
7.	"Love Is the Way of Life"
8.	"Sexual Telepathy"
9.	"Happy Little Nobody's Waggy Tail Dog"
10.	"Always a First Time"
11.	"Make a Better World"
