= Mitch Goudy =

American singer-songwriter

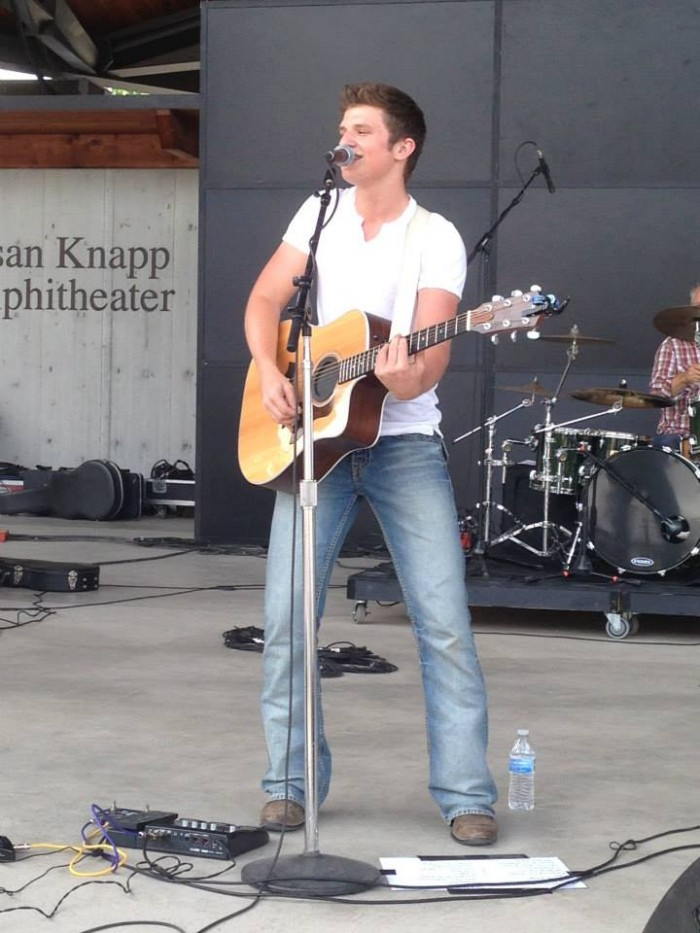
- Mitch Goudy performs at the Iowa State Fair

Background information
- Also known as: "Rowdie" Goudy
- Born: November 2, 1994 (age 31); Fairfield, Iowa, United States
- Genres: Country
- Occupations: Singer, songwriter, guitarist, producer
- Instruments: Vocals, acoustic guitar, electric guitar, bass guitar, piano
- Years active: 2013–present
- Label: Third Floor Records
- Spouse: Hope Blanchard (m. 2017)

Mitch Goudy (born November 2, 1994), also known as "Rowdie" Mitch Goudy, is an American country singer, songwriter, guitarist, and record producer from Iowa. He records on Third Floor Records. In 2014, Goudy was on the Country Music Association "Who New to Watch" list.

== Early life ==
Goudy was born in Iowa. His early influences included Eric Church, Garth Brooks and Willie Nelson. Goudy's father was the sound man for the raceway in Eldon, Iowa.

== Career ==
Goudy records on the independent label Third Floor Records. In November 2013, he released his first single, "Blow These Speakers Out". His second single, "Ain't My Fault" was released in June 2014. and was coupled by his first official music video. Goudy has opened for The Oak Ridge Boys, Rodney Atkins, and Joe Nichols.

== Discography ==
=== Albums ===
- Wild (2013)
- #Rowdie (2014)

=== Singles ===
Year	Single	Peak Chart Positions	Album
2013	"Blow These Speakers Out"	76	WILD
2014	"Ain't My Fault"	66	#ROWDIE
2015	"My Girl's Hand"	TBD	Single

=== Music videos ===
Year	Video	Director
2014	"Ain't My Fault"	Ray Zate; Producer, Stephanie Langston

== Awards ==
Year	Association	Award
2014	Country Music Association (CMA)	Who New to Watch
2014	Digital Journal	Top Ten Male Country Artists to Watch
