= Our Lady of Guadalupe Church & International Shrine of St. Jude =

Church building in New Orleans, LA

Coordinates: 29.9585°N 90.0707°W

Our Lady of Guadalupe Church & International Shrine of St. Jude is a Roman Catholic church located on Rampart Street in New Orleans, Louisiana.

It is the oldest surviving church building in the city (originally established as the Chapel of St. Anthony of Padua), the back of the church is bordered by Basin Street, and the parish is predominantly African-American. The church is one of multiple parishes in the city that celebrates a weekly "Gospel Jazz Mass" on Sunday mornings.

In November 2025, the Archdiocese of New Orleans placed over 150 parishes and charities in Chapter 11 bankruptcy protection as part of a settlement plan to resolve hundreds of sex abuse lawsuits. This wave of bankruptcies included this church.

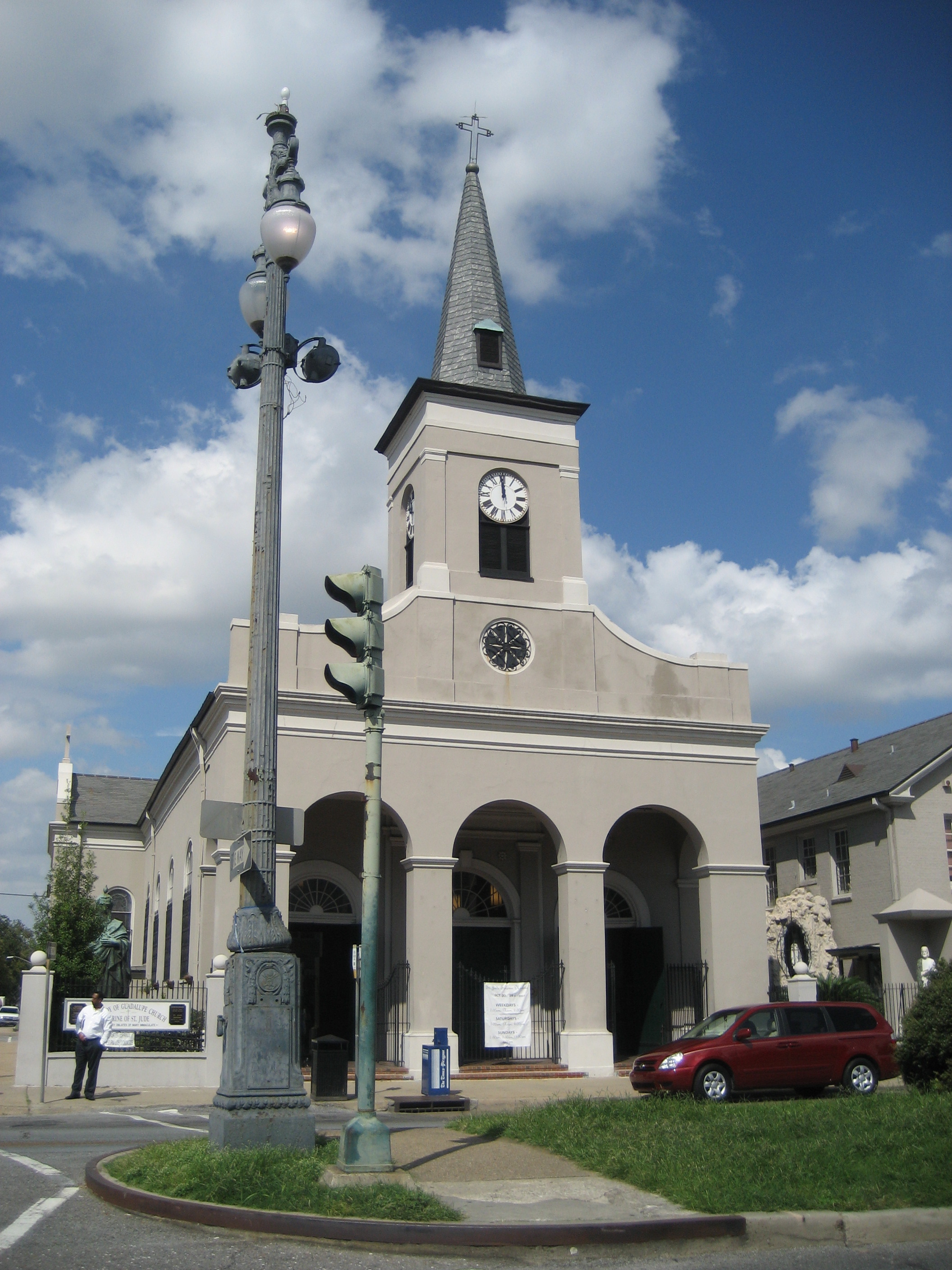
Exterior of Our Lady of Guadalupe church on Rampart Street

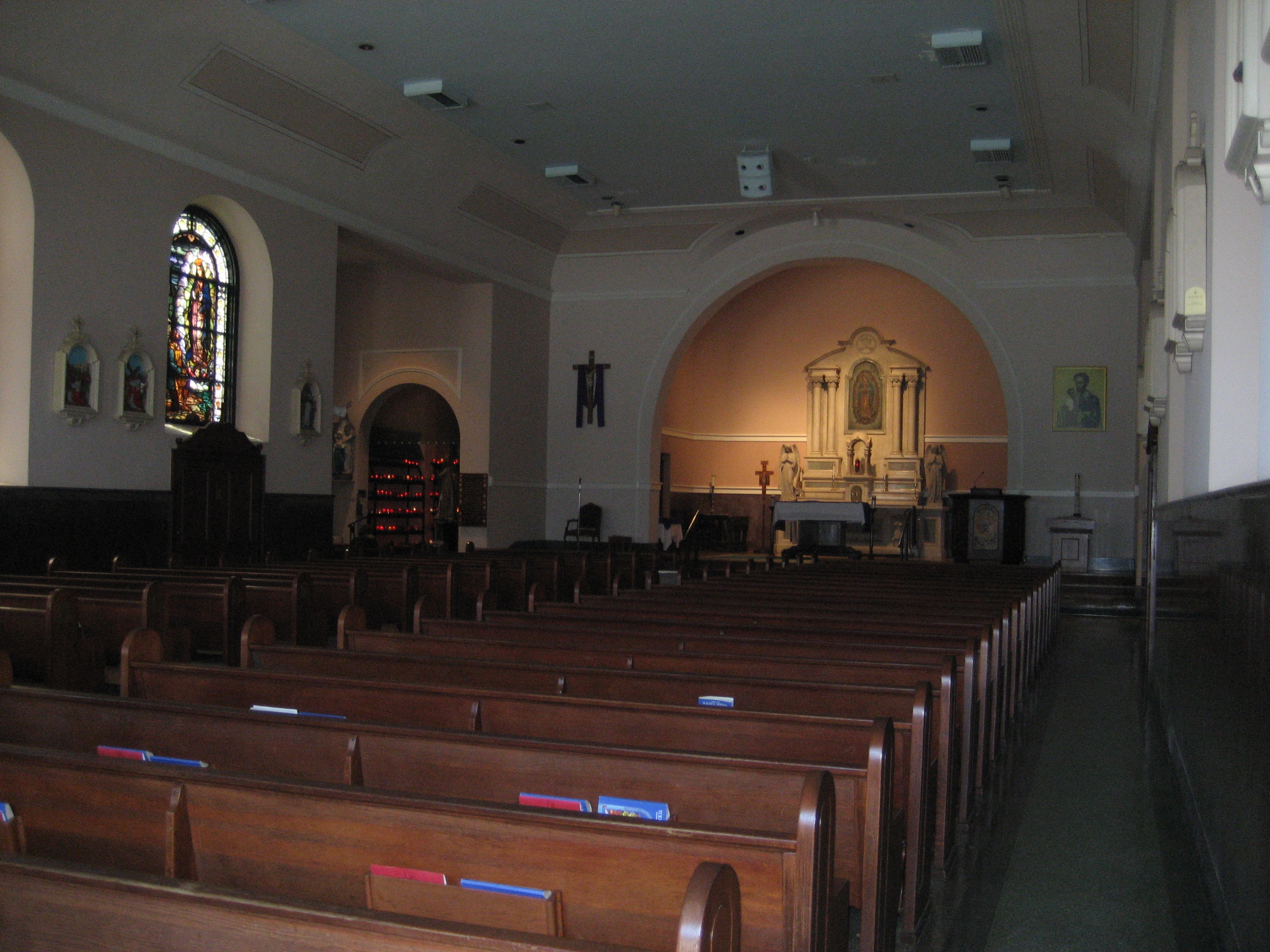
Interior of Our Lady of Guadalupe Church

== Description ==
The church was built in 1827 and dedicated as a mortuary chapel for victims of yellow fever. It was erected close to St. Louis Cemeteries #1 and #2, the primary Catholic cemeteries at the time (St. Louis Cemetery #1 is located directly behind the church, right across Basin Street). At the time, it was thought that exhalations from the dead could spread the disease, so St Anthony's was established to relieve the burden then stretching St. Louis Cathedral thin.

In 1918, Archbishop John Shaw asked the Missionary Oblates of Mary Immaculate to serve at the chapel (which had fallen into disuse), at which point the missionaries renamed it to its current moniker.

In the 1930s, parishioners praying to Saint Jude had their prayers answered, which resulted in a tradition of regular novenas to Saint Jude (that continues today) and the erection of a shrine to Saint Jude (which is still maintained today). The St. Jude Shrine is located in the area to the left of the altar, and it includes a relic of St. Jude.

The statue of Saint Expedite is also visited by Catholics, as well as some local followers of Voodoo.

The church grounds also feature a Marian grotto, located between the church and the adjacent rectory.
