= Smokey Johnson =

American drummer, songwriter (1936–2015)

Background information
- Born: Joseph Johnson Jr. November 14, 1936; New Orleans, Louisiana, U.S.
- Died: October 6, 2015 (aged 78) New Orleans, Louisiana, U.S.
- Genres: Jazz, funk, blues, soul, R&B
- Occupation: Musician
- Instrument: Drums
- Years active: 1953–1993

Joseph "Smokey" Johnson Jr. (November 14, 1936 – October 6, 2015) was an American drummer. He was one of the musicians, session players, and songwriters who served as the backbone for New Orleans' output of jazz, funk, blues, soul, and R&B music.

== Life and career ==
Born to Joseph Johnson Sr. and Rinda Williams, Johnson grew up in the Tremé neighborhood of New Orleans, a community rich in jazz history. He started on trombone at an early age and took lessons from Yvonne Busch, an influential music teacher who happened to be the Johnsons' neighbor. He switched to drums at age twelve. His first drum set was given to him by his grandfather. He attended Craig School and Clark High School where Yvonne Busch taught. He played in school bands. At age seventeen he started to perform professionally at local clubs including Club Tijuana, and toured with professional musicians during summers. After high school he joined James "Sugar Boy" Crawford’s band the Chapaka Shawee, also known as Cane Cutters. He also performed with Roy Brown and Red Tyler.

In 1957 Johnson joined Dave Bartholomew's band and replaced drummer Earl Palmer who had moved to Los Angeles. Johnson said he had learned a lot by watching Palmer play, and he noted the proficiency of New Orleans drummers in using the bass drum of a drum kit. He said in Bartholomew's band he had freedom and was expected to be creative. He was nicknamed "Smokey" after a bandmate joked about smoke coming out of his bass drum at a performance. He became an in demand session musician after the release of his first recording with Bartholomew's band. He was with the band from 1957 to around 1964 and performed on many recording sessions for Imperial Records. In 1963 Johnson's work with the band was featured as a soloist on the track "Portrait of a Drummer" in the album New Orleans House Party.

In 1963 Johnson and several prominent New Orleans musicians, including Earl King and Wardell Quezergue, went to Detroit and recorded at Motown Records. The objective was to market their music nationally. Due to contractual conflicts, very few of the recordings were released; however, Johnson's drumming left an impression on Berry Gordy and the Motown musicians. Johnson was asked to stay and recorded in Detroit for about two months. According to Earl King, Johnson's drumming style was of particular interest to Motown musicians, and according to both King and Eskew Reeder, over time Motown's sound was influenced by New Orleans music.

In late 1950s and 1960s, Johnson performed with Imperial recording artists such as Fats Domino, Earl King and Snooks Eaglin. He performed on Earl King's funk classic "Trick Bag" and on Professor Longhair's carnival classic "Big Chief". In 1964 he released a two-part single titled "It Ain't My Fault" as a leader. The song was developed over a drum cadence written years earlier by Johnson. The melody was developed in collaboration with Wardell Quezergue. According to Dan Phillips, the song is an early example of incorporating second line syncopation into pop music. The song has become a Mardi Gras and a brass band standard.

In 1960s Johnson was an in demand session musician and served as the house drummer for Quezergue's Nola Records. He released six double-sided singles as a leader. The tracks were later re-issued in a compilation album titled It Ain't My Fault. According to William Ruhlmann of AllMusic, the recordings define "a development from soul-jazz to funk" and are "a solid part of the history of New Orleans music."

In 1973 he joined Fats Domino's band. He had previously recorded with Domino as a session musician, however from 1973 to 1993 he toured with Domino on a full-time basis. On weekends when in New Orleans he performed straight-ahead jazz in local clubs with saxophonist Fred Kemp, pianist Ed Frank, bassist Erving Charles and others. The clubs included Kemp's Bar, Gerry's Club, Lu & Charlie's, and Joe’s Cozy Corner.

Over his career Johnson recorded on hundreds of New Orleans productions. In 1993 he suffered a debilitating stroke and stopped playing drums. In 1994 several tribute performances were organized in New Orleans in recognition of his career. In 2005 he was forced to leave his home in the wake of Hurricane Katrina. After the hurricane he resided at the Musicians' Village in the Upper Ninth Ward of New Orleans. Johnson died on October 6, 2015, after a long illness. He was survived by his wife Gwendolyn P. Johnson and children.

== Covers ==
"It Ain't My Fault" has been recorded by Dejan's Olympia Brass Band, Rebirth Brass Band, Dirty Dozen Brass Band, Treme Brass Band, Charmaine Neville, Milton Batiste, Shane Theriot, Young Olympians, Ambrosia Brass Band, David Roe, Cole Prior Stevens, and Zydeco All-Stars. The song has also been sampled by Silkk the Shocker, Mystikal, Mariah Carey, DJ Melo-Mix and DJ Kid Fresh.

In 2010, the Preservation Hall Jazz Band recorded a new version of the song, with lyrics, to help raise relief funds for the BP Oil Spill. The song featured Mos Def, Trombone Shorty and Lenny Kravitz.

== Royalty dispute ==
In late 1990s "It Ain't My Fault" was sampled by hip hop artist Silkk the Shocker. Silkk's work was further sampled on Mariah Carey's album Rainbow. Johnson and co-writer Wardell Quezergue had given 50 percent ownership to Tuff City Records and had made the label their agent. The royalties associated with Carey's use were estimated to be $300,000. In 2002 Johnson and Quezergue sued Tuff City for non-payment. Tuff City argued it had accrued significant losses associated with recuperating the royalties, but failed to provide convincing documents to support its argument. The court rejected Tuff City's argument and the case was settled in 2011.
