= Earl King =

American blues singer, guitarist, and songwriter (1934–2003)

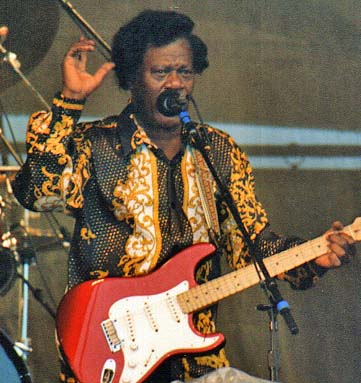
- King at the New Orleans Jazz & Heritage Festival, 1997

Background information
- Born: Earl Silas Johnson IV; February 7, 1934
- Origin: New Orleans, Louisiana, United States
- Died: April 17, 2003 (aged 69)
- Genres: New Orleans blues; New Orleans R&B
- Occupations: Musician; singer; songwriter; record producer
- Instruments: Vocals; guitar
- Years active: 1953–2001
- Labels: Savoy; Specialty; Ace; Imperial; Kansu; Sonet; Black Top

Earl Silas Johnson IV (February 7, 1934 – April 17, 2003), known as Earl King, was an American singer, guitarist, and songwriter, most active in blues music. A composer of blues standards such as "Come On" (covered by Jimi Hendrix, Freddie King, Stevie Ray Vaughan) and "Big Chief" (recorded by Professor Longhair), he was an important figure in New Orleans R&B.

== Biography ==
King was born in New Orleans, Louisiana, United States. His father was a piano player. He died when Earl was still a baby, and Earl was brought up by his mother. With his mother, he started going to church at an early age. In his youth he sang gospel music, but he took the advice of a friend to switch to blues to make a better living.

King started to play the guitar at the age of 15. Soon he started entering talent contests at local clubs, including the Dew Drop Inn. At one such club he met his idol, Guitar Slim. King started imitating Slim, and his presence had a big impact on his musical direction. In 1954, Slim was injured in an automobile accident (right around the time he had the number 1 R&B hit "The Things That I Used To Do"), and King was deputized to continue a tour with Slim's band, representing himself as Slim. After succeeding in this role, King became a regular at the Dew Drop Inn.

His first recording was made in 1953. As Earl Johnson, he released a 78-rpm record, "Have You Gone Crazy" b/w "Beggin' at Your Mercy", for Savoy Records. The following year, the talent scout Johnny Vincent introduced King to Specialty Records, for which he recorded some sides, including "A Mother's Love", which was locally popular. In 1955, King signed with Vincent's label, Ace Records. His first single for that label, "Those Lonely, Lonely Nights", was a hit, reaching number 7 on the Billboard R&B chart. He continued to record for Ace for the next five years. During that time, he also he started writing songs for other artists, such as Roland Stone and Jimmy Clanton.

In 1960, Dave Bartholomew invited King to record for Imperial Records. In sessions for that label, he was backed by a host of musicians, including Bob French, George French, James Booker, and Wardell Quezergue. It was at this label he recorded his signature songs "Come On" and "Trick Bag". The former has been a much-covered standard for decades, notably recorded by Jimi Hendrix, Freddie King, Stevie Ray Vaughan and Anson Funderburgh. The latter has also been widely covered, with versions by Johnny Winter, the Meters and Robert Palmer. King co-wrote a number of songs with Bartholomew, either under his own name or under the pseudonym "E.C. King".

King recorded for Imperial until 1963. He went without a recording contract for the rest of the 1960s. During this time, he mostly concentrated on producing and songwriting for the local labels Nola and Watch. His compositions from this era include "Big Chief", recorded by Professor Longhair; "Teasin' You", recorded by Willie Tee; and "Do-Re-Mi", recorded by Lee Dorsey. He went to Detroit for an audition with Motown Records and recorded a few tracks in the mid-1960s. Three tracks from that session are included on the album Motown's Blue Evolution, released in 1996.

In 1972, he was joined by Allen Toussaint and the Meters to record the album Street Parade. Atlantic Records initially showed interest in releasing it but eventually declined. The title track was released as a single on the Kansu label at the time, but the rest lay unreleased until 1981, when the album was issued by Charly Records in the UK.

In the 1970s, he recorded another album, That Good ~~Old~~ New New Orleans Rock 'n Roll, which was released by Sonet in 1977. He also appeared on the album New Orleans Jazz & Heritage Festival 1976.

In the early 1980s, King met Hammond Scott, the co-owner of Black Top Records, and started to record for the label. The first album Glazed, on which he was backed by Roomful of Blues, was released in 1986. This particular album was nominated for a Grammy Award. A second album, Sexual Telepathy, released in 1990, featured Snooks Eaglin on two tracks and backing by Ronnie Earl & The Broadcasters on some tracks. He recorded his third album for Black Top, Hard River to Cross (1993), with backing by George Porter Jr., David Torkanowsky, and Herman V. Ernest III.

In 2001, King was hospitalized for an illness during a tour of New Zealand, but that did not stop him from performing. In December of the same year, he toured Japan. and he continued to perform off and on locally in New Orleans until his death.

King died on April 17, 2003, from diabetes-related complications, just a week before the New Orleans Jazz & Heritage Festival. His funeral was held on April 30, during the festival, and many musicians attended it, including Dr. John, Leo Nocentelli and Aaron Neville. His Imperial recordings, which had long been out of print, were reissued on CD soon after he died. The June 2003 issue of OffBeat, a local music magazine, paid tribute to King with a series of articles on him.

== Discography ==
=== Albums ===
- 1977: That Good ~~Old~~ New New Orleans Rock 'n Roll (Sonet)
- 1981: Street Parade (Charly, recorded in 1972)
- 1986: Glazed with Roomful of Blues (Black Top)
- 1990: Sexual Telepathy (Black Top)
- 1993: Hard River to Cross (Black Top)

=== Compilations ===
- 1982: Trick Bag: The Best of Earl King (Imperial/Pathe Marconi) -Imperial material
- 1997: Earl's Pearls: The Very Best of Earl King 1955–1960 (Westside) -Ace material
- 2003: Come On: The Complete Imperial Recordings (Okra-Tone) -Imperial material
- 2005: New Orleans Blues (Tomato) -unreleased material recorded in 1972 for Atlantic Records
- 2006: The Chronological Earl King 1953–1955 (Classics [Blues & Rhythm Series]) -Savoy, Specialty, Ace material
- 2016: Come On: 40 Original Rhythm & Blues Classics (Not Now Music) 2-CD
- 2016: Let The Good Times Roll: Singles As & Bs 1955–1962 (Jasmine)
- 2018: The Singles Collection 1953–62 (Acrobat) 2-CD
- 2019: More Than Gold: The Complete 1955–1962 Ace & Imperial Singles (Soul Jam)

=== Singles ===
- "Have You Gone Crazy" / "Beggin' at Your Mercy" [as Earl Johnson] (Savoy 1102) Jul 1953
- "A Mother's Love" / "I'm Your Best Bet, Baby" (Specialty 495) May 1954
- "What Can I Do?" / "'Til I Say Well Done" (Specialty 497) Jun 1954
- "No One But Me" / "Eating and Sleeping" (Specialty 531) Sep 1954
- "Those Lonely, Lonely Nights" / "Baby You Can Get Your Gun" (Ace 509) Jul 1955
- "Little Girl" / "My Love Is Strong" (Ace 514) Jan 1956
- "It Must Have Been Love" / "I'll Take You Back Home" (Ace 517) May 1956
- "Mother Told Me Not to Go" / "Is Everything All Right" (Ace 520) Jul 1956
- "Those Lonely, Lonely Feelings" / "You Can Fly High" (Ace 529) Jun 1957
- "Well'O Well'O Well'O Baby" / "I'll Never Get Tired" (Ace 543) Jan 1958
- "Everybody Got to Cry" / "I Met a Stranger" (Vin 1003) 1958; recorded 1955
- "Everybody's Carried Away" / "Weary Silent Night" (Ace 564) Jun 1959
- "Don't You Know You're Wrong" / "Buddy It's Time to Go" (Ace 598) Jul 1960
- "Come On (Let the Good Times Roll)" (Parts 1 & 2) (Imperial 5713) Nov 1960
- "Darling Honey Angel Child" / "I Can't Help Myself" (Rex 1015) Jan 1961
- "Love Me Now" / "The Things That I Used to Do" (Imperial 5730) Feb 1961
- "You Better Know" / "Mama and Papa" (Imperial 5774) Sep 1961
- "Trick Bag" / "Always a First Time" (Imperial 5811) Jan 1962
- "We Are Just Friends" / "You're More to Me Than Gold" (Imperial 5858) Jun 1962
- "A Case of Love" / "Come Along with Me" (Imperial 5891) Nov 1962
- "Don't You Lose It" / "Don't Cry My Friend" (Post 10004) Dec 1962
- "You'll Remember Me" / "She's My Drivin' Wheel" (Amy 942) Nov 1965
- "Poor Sam" / "Feeling My Way Around" (Hot Line 908; Checker 1167) Apr 1967
