= St. Genevieve Church =

Roman Catholic archdiocese in Louisiana, U.S.

Coordinates: 30°16′8″N 89°50′42″W

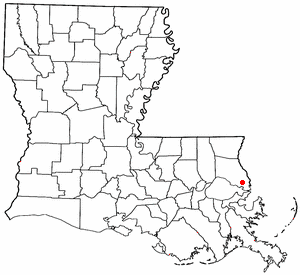
Locator map of Slidell, in the State of Louisiana

St. Genevieve Church is a parish of the Roman Catholic Archdiocese of New Orleans located along Bayou Liberty, not far from the northeastern edge of Lake Pontchartrain in Slidell, Louisiana, United States. St. Genevieve is one of eight parishes which belongs to Deanery XII - East St. Tammany - Washington Deanery, an ecclesiastical division of the archdiocese.

== History ==
=== Introduction ===
St. Genevieve Church at Bayou Liberty (Bayou Bonfouca), is mission of Our Lady of Lourdes Church, Slidell, In 1958 poet-priest and missioner to the Choctaws, Abbé Adrien Rouquette, described below:

After the dedication, the Rev. Timothy Pugh, O.S.B., pastor in Slidell, will celebrate solemn Mass in the new church. Ministers will be the Rev. James J. Skelly, deacon; the Rev. Joseph Bordenave, O.S.B., subdeacon; and the Rev. Raphael Barousse, O.S.B., master of ceremonies. Abbot Columban Thuis, O.S.B., will preach. Construction of the new church was begun early in 1958 while St. Genevieve was a mission of Sacred Heart parish in Lacombe under Father Bordenave. It was completed under Father Pugh after the mission was attached to the Slidell parish last summer. The brick and steel-arch structure, with terrazzo floor and acoustical tile ceiling was erected at a cost of $65,000. Seating capacity is over 400. There are two large sacristy rooms and an upstairs meeting room.

Dedication of the new Chapel of St. Genevieve revives memorable figures and events of more than a century ago. The pioneer brick church is inextricably linked with Choctaw Indians, the Cousin family, Abbé Adrian Rouquette — Louisiana's famous poet-priest — and his brother, Dominique, another great poet, and several famous missionary priests, who labored devotedly in this section of St. Tammany Parish.

The Creole priest of Louisiana, a classical poet, the missionary among the Choctaw Indians, and his happy-go-lucky brother, "old Jupiter in a black blanket,", Mrs. Dagmar Renshaw LeBreton styles him in her splendid volume Chaht a-Ima. Dominique, who was a master of lyric poetry, made Bonfouca their haunt. Abbé Rouquette drew religious inspiration as well as poetical visions; while Dominique found peace from the demands of life. Likewise, concepts that he embodied in his poems.

Priests as Father George Lamy covered the territory on horseback; Father Lecozic (future Chancellor of the Archdiocese), Father Manoritta (former Italian Dominican), who trekked back and forth from Bonfouca and Lacombe to Covington and Abita Springs; Father Eugene Aveilhe, builder of churches, schools and chapels, the tireless Father Lavaquery, and Father Francis Balay, O.S.B., who brought St. Genevieve's out of its ruins.

=== First priestly visit in 1700 ===
The first record of a priest's visit on the north shore of Lake Pontchartrain is that of Father DuRu, Jesuit missionary, in 1700, who accompanied Iberville on his second voyage to Louisiana. With Monsieur de Sauville, Father DuRu left from Bay St. Louis and made his way on foot through the Pearl River swamp to the Acolapissa Indian village, a trip of many days, filled with incredible hardships.

Later, priests from the church at New Orleans visited the area occasionally. Madisonville had the first church in that section, then Covington, under the French priest, Father Jouanneault, who also opened an academy. Finally, a church was erected at Mandeville around 1850.

After the French Revolution, the Cousin family, refugees, established themselves on extensive land holdings between Bonfouca and Mandeville. In 1852–1853, Madame Anatole Cousin, the former Camille Pichon, built a brick church for her family and the family slaves on the Cousin property on Bayou Bonfouca. She was the daughter of Genevieve Dubuisson and Francois Pichon. Evidently, the church was placed under the invocation of St. Genevieve in memory of her mother.

In 1845, the nephew of Anatole Cousin had been ordained at New Orleans. This was Abbé Adrian Rouquette, the first native Creole vocation after the Louisiana Purchase. Uncle and nephew were almost of the same age, and as the uncle had the same literary tastes as his priest-nephew, Father Rouquette was a frequent visitor at the Cousin home in Bonfouca. So was his poet-brother, Dominique. After the Chapel of St. Genevieve was built, Father Rouquette often offered Mass there, as did also the priest stationed at Mandeville, Madisonville or Covington.

Some 50 feet (15 m) away from the brick Chapel of St. Genevieve, Mrs. Cousin also erected a rectory in the convenience and comfort of the visiting priests. Among priests who officiated there were Father J. Outendriek until 1854, Father C. M. Dubuis, Father Lamy, Father C.M. Giraud in the early 1860s, then Father Lecozic. Between 1864 and 1872, it was Father Manoritta followed by Father Beges and Father Gratz.

=== Native Americans attend services ===
Choctaw Native Americans came to services. Around the time that Mrs. Cousin built St. Genevieve Chapel, Abbé Rouquette moved from New Orleans to live and work among the Natives in the vicinity of the homes of his family. His work centered principally around Chinchuba and Bayou Lacombe, where he built small chapels. For ages the southern part of St. Tammany Parish on the lake shore to Pearl River had been the land of the Choctaws, and Bonfouca had been one of their meeting places.

In May 1867, French Dominican, Father Pierre A. Chocarne, crossed over from New Orleans to visit with the famous poet-priest, Father Rouquette. He offered Mass in St. Genevieve's chapel.

Archbishop Francis Janssens became Ordinary of the New Orleans See in 1888, and promptly interested himself in the St. Tammany missions. On October 23 of that year, he gave Confirmation to 47 adults and children at St. Genevieve's. In his diary, the archbishop wrote: "There is a brick church in fair condition at Bonfouca, with a good presbytery, and the people are simple and well disposed. We (Father Mignot and the archbishop) slept there, and left Wednesday morning at 5 a.m. for Bayou Lacombe."

Father Eugene Aveilhe was pastor of Mandeville at the time, and Bonfouca was still a mission of St. Theresa's Church, later called Our Lady of the Lake Church, of Mandeville. He referred to the Bonfouca chapel in his letters and reports it as "St. Genovefa." Already in 1887, a movement was on foot to divide the Mandeville parish and use Bonfouca as a center for a new one. Father Aveilhe told Archbishop Francis X. Leras: "Bonfouca has a new roof to its church, a nice yard well cared for since three years, and a decent rectory."

=== Visited by horse and buggy ===
The Rev. E. Lavaquery was named pastor of Mandeville in 1890, and began to visit St. Genevieve's by horse and buggy on the second and fourth Sunday of every month and twice a month on week days. In 1891, Bonfouca had a private school for 48 colored children, and there was a public school at Lacombe with 65, where catechism and prayers were taught under the direction of the pastor. The area was becoming important, and Father Lavaquery in 1890 built Sacred Heart Church at Lacombe. Archbishop Janssens dedicated it on December 1, 1890, before the roof was completed.

For the first time in its long history, St. Genevieve in 1893 was taken away from Mandeville and assigned to the new parish of Lacombe, with Father Paquet as pastor. The new Church of Our Lady of Lourdes built at Slidell by Father Lavaquery and St. Joseph's Church at Florenville were also made missions of Lacombe. But this arrangement lasted only two years, 1893–1894. In 1894, Bonfouca was listed as having 400 Catholics, and 102 Communions in the year, eight Baptisms and two burials. Pew rent for the year totalled $2.50, while Sunday collections amounted to $12.50.

During the ensuing year (1895) the number of Communions had increased to 293 and Baptisms to 10. Three marriages were performed and one was validated. There were four burials. Pew rent improved materially — $46.00. Total revenues for the year were $131.10. After Father Paquet was transferred, Lacombe and Bonfouca reverted to Mandeville as missions and were served by Rev. G. Mertens. He visited St. Genevieve once a month on a week day.

An important event occurred in 1891, which served as prelude to the organization of the new parish centered at Lacombe under Father Paquet. On March 31, 1891, Madame Camille Pichon, widow of Anatole Cousin, the same pious lady who had built the St. Genevieve chapel, appeared before Notary Joseph Duvigneaud of New Orleans, and declared that the "religious community in the neighborhood of Domecnil place in St. Tammany Parish is in urgent need of the spiritual ministrations of a priest of the Roman Catholic Church, and that His Grace, Archbishop Francis Jennsens of New Orleans, has consented to send to the vicinity of said Domecnil place a priest to minister to their spiritual wants at least once a month."

=== Land given to archbishop ===
Therefore, Mrs. Anatole Cousin donated to the archbishop and his successors the parcel of land with all buildings and improvements thereon on the right or west bank of Bayou Liberty in St. Tammany Parish, bounded by the lands of Etienne Narcisse and Charles Pichon, and Bayou Liberty. The track covered sixty one-hundredths of an acre, valued at $250. Mrs. Cousin declared this land was a portion of ground which she had acquired by inheritance from her mother, Genevieve Dubuisson, widow of Francis Pichon.

Before the turn of the century, the Rev. Nelson Ayres and the Rev. Joseph Schmitt, pastors of Mandeville, served Bonfouca; then up to 1903, it was Father Laroche. The latter referred to Bonfouca as the "best part of the Mandeville parish." Many people there, he said, didn't speak English. Bonfouca and Lacombe, he said, were important missions.

Then from December 24, 1903 to the end of 1912, the Rev. Leander M. Roth served as Mandeville's pastor and served St. Genevieve's chapel. Several missions were conducted at Bonfouca during his pastorate, by two Redemptorists, a Lazarist (Father Vauthier, who spoke French), and a Jesuit. A great deal of spiritual good was accomplished. When First Communion and Confirmation were held at St. Genevieve's in July 1910, a three-day retreat was conducted by Father Vauthier in French.

=== Dead buried without priest ===
For Sunday Mass at Bonfouca, once a month, Father Roth was helped by a Benedictine Father, but the pastor visited the mission by buggy on a week day. He reported to Archbishop James H. Blenk, S.M., that spiritual conditions were improving at Bonfouca, but people buried their dead without a priest — he had had but one funeral in five years. Revenues from there had dwindled and there were no funds to repair the chapel or rectory, which both began to decay. Mrs. Cousin had died and the chapel began to suffer from neglect.

Father Roth was transferred to Kenner at the end of 1912. Then the Rev. Francis Balay, O.S.B., was named visiting priest for Bonfouca in 1913, coming from St. Joseph Abbey, where he was still teaching French to the seminarians.

=== Bell hung from oak tree ===
Under his direction, Bonfouca revived. When he first came, Father Balay found the steeple on the historic chapel had disappeared and the old bell had been hung to the branch of a great oak nearby. The rectory too was in bad shape. But before attempting anything, Father Balay visited every family in the area, regardless of race, then on August 10, 1913, he offered Mass for them in Bonfouca. All Catholics of the vicinity attended and a large number approached the sacraments.

Having assurance of the support of the people, he proceeded with the renovation of St. Genevieve's chapel. For its rededication, he held Solemn Communion. Sunday, June 21, 1914, was a gala day for Bonfouca, as folks saw the venerable chapel restored to service. Father Balay was generously supported, in his restoration work by Mrs. Armand Cousin, Mr. and Mrs. J. P. Pichon and Mr. and Mrs. Dubuisson. The energetic Benedictine priest also erected a school which was placed in charge of lay teachers. In 1915, Lacombe was also placed in his care.

Father Balay continued to look after St. Genevieve's chapel even after he became pastor of Slidell in 1929. Then on Sept. 3, 1933, the Rev. Joseph Bordenave, O.S.B. was sent to Bayou Lacombe as assistant to Father Balay to take charge of all the missions attached to Slidell. These included Lacombe and Bayou Liberty (St. Genevieve).

Finally, in 1945, Lacombe and the missions were made into a separate parish once more with definite boundaries, and Father Bordenave as pastor. On Sept. 17, 1947, Pearl River was assigned to Slidell, and at the same time permission was given to Father Bordenave to begin a drive for funds for a new church at Bayou Liberty or Bonfouca. Part of the original brick church of 1852–1853 still stands as does part of the original rectory. Still seen are the wooden pegs used instead of nails, and the sills with V-shaped grooves as was customary in those days.

=== Late 20th and early 21st century ===
A new church building was constructed starting in 1958, dedicated on December 28, 1958 by Archbishop Joseph F. Rummel.

It was destroyed by Hurricane Katrina in 2005, and the ruins demolished. The current church building was dedicated in 2012.

==== Bankruptcy ====
In November 2025, the Archdiocese of New Orleans placed over 150 parishes and charities in Chapter 11 bankruptcy protection as part of a settlement plan to resolve hundreds of sex abuse lawsuits. This wave of bankruptcies included this church.

== See also ==
- Archdiocese of New Orleans
- Fr. J. Roel Lungay
- Pierre Le Moyne d'Iberville
- St. Genevieve
- Panthéon, Paris
