= St. Vincent De Paul Roman Catholic Church (New Orleans, Louisiana) =

Historic church in Louisiana, United States

- Blessed Francis Xavier Seelos Catholic Church
- U.S. National Register of Historic Places
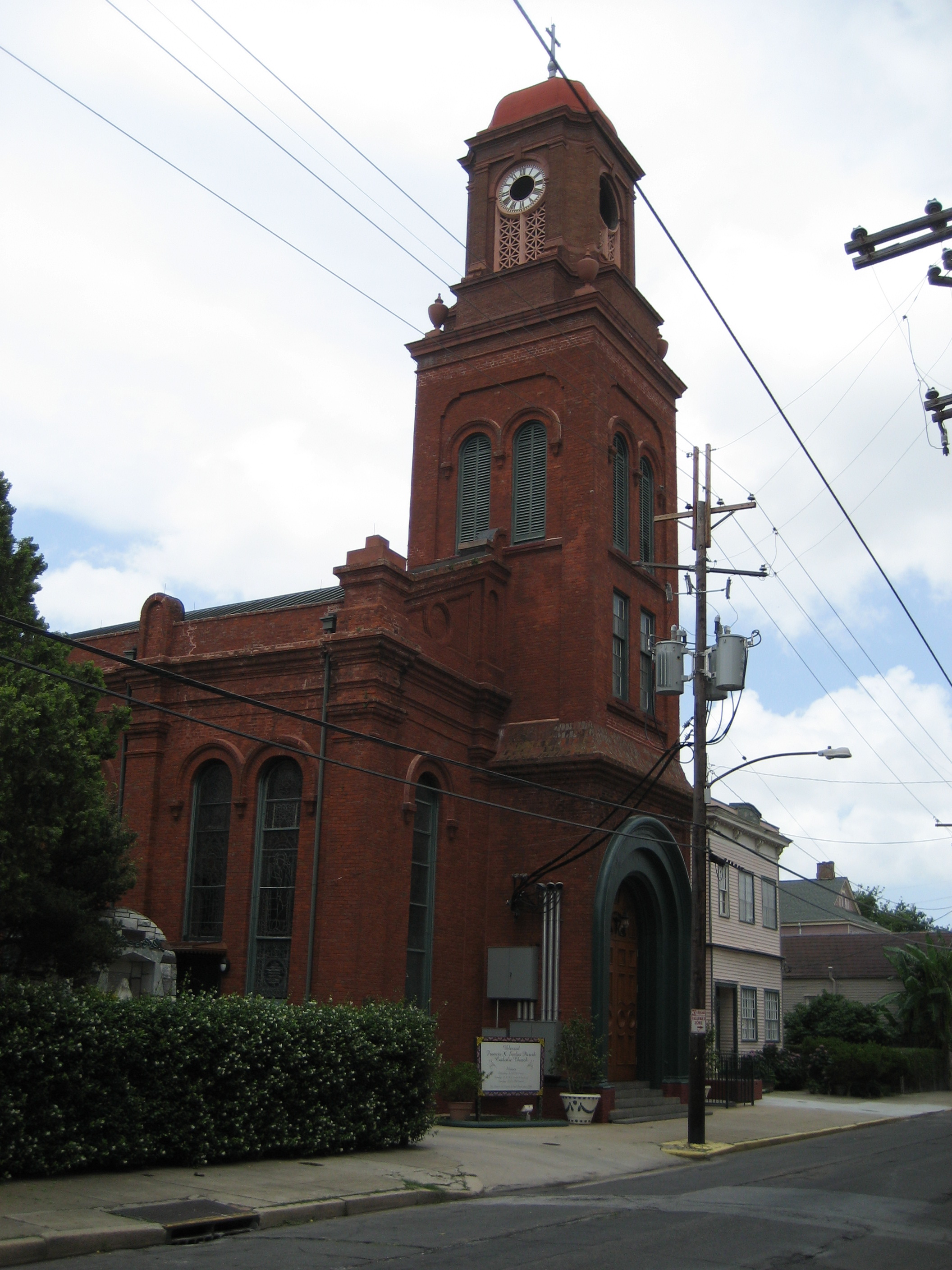

- Location within East New Orleans Location within Louisiana Location within the United States
- Location: 3051 Dauphine, New Orleans, Louisiana
- Coordinates: 29°57′52″N 90°2′46″W
- Built: 1866
- NRHP reference No.: 76000971
- Added to NRHP: April 13, 1976

Blessed Francis Xavier Seelos Catholic Church, formerly St. Vincent de Paul Church, is a church in New Orleans listed on the National Register of Historic Places. The parish was founded in 1838 as the third parish in the city. The original parish boundaries intersected those of St. Louis Cathedral, New Orleans and served the French community. In fact, the French tradition was so strong that sermons were not given in English until the 1880s. In later years, its parish boundaries overlapped the boundaries of Holy Trinity Church, which served German residents.

The church was originally housed in a wood frame building built in 1838. In 1866, a red brick building was built, in the basilica plan, and the original frame building became a school. The church added a clock tower in 1924.

In 2001, as part of a study of parish facilities, the Roman Catholic Archdiocese of New Orleans announced that five parishes in the area would be merged into one parish. Annunciation, St. Cecilia, St. Gerard (a parish for the hearing-impaired), Sts. Peter and Paul, and St. Vincent de Paul were merged into a new parish, Blessed Francis Xavier Seelos. The new church was located in the church and facilities of St. Vincent de Paul. On May 25, 2003, the building was severely damaged by a fire. The main altar was destroyed, along with several murals and the sacristy. As part of the repairs, the former altar from Sts. Peter and Paul Church was moved to Blessed Seelos Parish, along with the pulpit from St. Cecilia. Hurricanes Katrina and Rita caused further damage to the nearby St. Gerard Center (the former Motherhouse of the Sisters of the Immaculate Conception), forcing the church to replace the roof.

In November 2025, the Archdiocese of New Orleans placed over 150 parishes and charities in Chapter 11 bankruptcy protection as part of a settlement plan to resolve hundreds of sex abuse lawsuits. This wave of bankruptcies included this church.
