= Willie Tee =

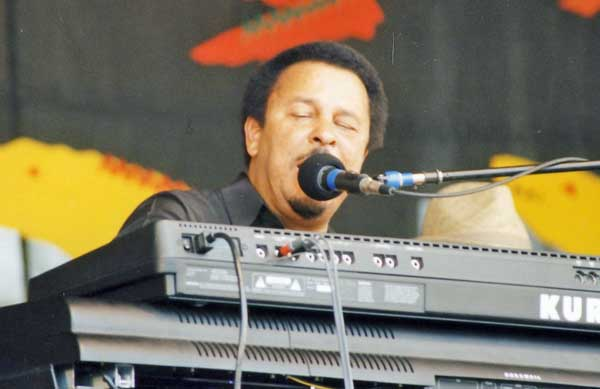
- Willie Tee (1996)

Background information
- Born: Wilson Turbinton; February 6, 1944; New Orleans, Louisiana, U.S.
- Died: September 11, 2007 (aged 63) New Orleans, Louisiana, U.S.
- Genres: R&B, soul, jazz, pop
- Occupations: Musician, singer
- Instruments: Keyboards, vocals
- Years active: 1962–2007
- Labels: AFO, NOLA, Atlantic, United Artists
- Website: willietee1.tripod.com

Wilson Turbinton (February 6, 1944 – September 11, 2007), professionally known as Willie Tee, was an American keyboardist, songwriter, singer, producer and notable early architect of New Orleans funk and soul, who helped shape the sound of New Orleans for more than four decades.

== Career ==
Tee arranged, co-wrote and led the band on the Wild Magnolias' self-titled 1974 debut album. The popularity of that recording, and the subsequent They Call Us Wild, introduced the Mardi Gras Indians' street-beat funk to the world.

Tee grew up in the Calliope Projects in New Orleans. His earliest influences ranged from the rhythm and blues of Professor Longhair to the jazz of John Coltrane.

He made his first recordings for the local AFO Records in 1962 while still a teenager. Three years later, he cut "Teasin' You", a soulful, mid-tempo composition for Atlantic Records. His "Walking Up a One-Way Street" and "Thank You John" were also popular hits.

In the late 1960s, Willie Tee & the Souls played venues from the Apollo Theater in Harlem to the Ivanhoe on Bourbon Street. After hearing the band at the Ivanhoe in 1968, jazz musician Cannonball Adderley encouraged Tee to record an instrumental album. The album was never released, but the master tapes were recently rediscovered in the vaults of Capitol Records. Tee's pop was called expressive, his funk ferocious and his jazz "like mirrors in a prism" by longtime producer Leo Sacks, who called Willie Tee "a monster on the B-3 organ" in a Times-Picayune article.

Tee's early recordings, many of which were reissued by New York's Tuff City Records, were employed as source material for rappers. Houston's Geto Boys sampled "Smoke My Peace Pipe", a song Tee had written for the Wild Magnolias. Sean Combs borrowed riffs and grooves from the Gaturs' "Concentrate" for the 1997 album No Way Out. Alex Chilton also recorded a version of "Thank You John" in the 1980s, and Russell Minus completed a suite of elegies in 1996.

More recently, New Orleans rapper Lil Wayne sampled "Moment of Truth", a song from Turbinton's 1976 album, Anticipation for "Tha Mobb", the opening track on Tha Carter II.

Tee remained active in his career as a producer, songwriter, performer and session musician. His collaborations with his brother Earl included 1988's Brothers for Life. He contributed to Dr. John's 2004 album, N'Awlinz: Dis Dat or D'Udda, and appeared briefly in the Oscar-winning Jamie Foxx film about Ray Charles, Ray.

In October 2005, after Hurricane Katrina devastated New Orleans, Turbinton accepted a job as a visiting lecturer in the music department at Princeton University, and spent the next four months working with music students there. In January 2006, he returned to Louisiana and settled in Baton Rouge.

In April 2007, the Louisiana Music Hall of Fame honored Tee for his contributions to Louisiana music with an induction.

Tee died on September 11, 2007, aged 63, four weeks after being diagnosed with colon cancer.
