= Forrest Gump (disambiguation) =

Forrest Gump is a 1994 feature film starring Tom Hanks.

Forrest Gump may also refer to:

- Forrest Gump (novel), 1986 novel by Winston Groom
- Forrest Gump (character), main character created by Winston Groom
- Forrest Gump – Original Motion Picture Score, film score by Alan Silvestri
- Forrest Gump: The Soundtrack, a soundtrack compilation album of the film
- "Forrest Gump" (song), by Frank Ocean from the album Channel Orange
- Jonas Deichmann, a German extreme athlete nicknamed Forrest Gump

== See also ==
- "Gump" (song), by Weird Al Yankovic, about the character
