= Irving Banister =

American guitarist (1933–2020)

Irving Sully Banister, Sr.
- Irving Banister

Background information
- Born: February 16, 1933; New Orleans, Louisiana, U.S.
- Died: December 15, 2020 (aged 87); New Orleans, Louisiana, U.S.
- Genres: Rhythm and blues
- Occupations: musician, band leader
- Instrument: guitar
- Years active: c.1952 – c.2020

Irving Sully Banister Sr. (February 16, 1933 – December 15, 2020) was an American guitarist who recorded and performed R&B music, in a career lasting more than sixty years."

== Early years ==
Irving Banister was born in New Orleans, Louisiana to Louis and Elsie Mae Banister. He had two brothers, Joe and Guardie. Banister formed a band with some of his fellow students at Booker T. Washington high school. "I was playing the trumpet until I was seventeen, but I got my front teeth knocked out," said Banister. "I couldn't hit the high notes anymore. There weren't any guitar players in the band, so I bought a big hollow body Epiphone, a pickup, and amplifier from a music store on South Broad Street for $100." James "Sugar Boy" Crawford recalled, "During high school we had a little band, nothing real organized at first. I was back playing piano... The other fellows in the band were Edgar "Big Boy" Myles, Warren Myles, Nolan Blackwell, Irving "Cat" Banister, and Alfred Bernard- just a bunch of youngsters having fun." In 1952, the group came to the attention of Dr. Daddy-O (Vernon Winslow), New Orleans' first black disc jockey, who aired a daily show on WMRY. He invited them to perform on his Saturday morning radio show. The band did not yet have a name, but they had an instrumental that was their theme song called "Chapaka Shawee", creole words they heard on the street that translated roughly as "we aren't raccoons". When Dr. Daddy-O wrote of the band as the "Chapaka Shawee" youngsters, in his column in The Louisiana Weekly, the name stuck. He booked the band's first job at the Shadowland Club on Washington Avenue in 1952. Sugar Boy remembered, "We were all still in school so we could only play on weekends."

The band's first recording session was through the intercession of Dr. Daddy-O with Aladdin Records on November 23, 1952. Dave Bartholomew, who was doing production work for Aladdin in New Orleans, signed the band. The contract stipulated 1/2-cent per song to be divided between the writers and 1/2-cent per record to go to Dr. Daddy-O. Potentially lucrative performance royalties were specifically excluded from the contract. Of the four songs recorded only two, "Early Sunday Morning" and "No One To Love Me", were released at the time, under the name The Sha-Weez. The record did not sell, but the band's popularity increased, assisted by their weekly radio broadcasts. They performed at Club Tiajuana and the Dew Drop Inn. The Dew Drop's owner Frank Painia also booked the band at out of town dates.

== Influences and techniques ==
Banister said his musicianship was limited at that time. "Every song was in B flat. I tuned the top three strings to a B flat chord and the bottom three strings regular. I'd just play the B flat chord open, then go to the four and five chords. We didn't have a bass player, so I'd play the bass patterns on the bottom strings. I wasn't good enough to solo then." At a 2011 Ponderosa Stomp Music History Conference in New Orleans Banister recalled how he studied blues guitarist Guitar Slim's playing at the Dew Drop Inn. " He played with a clamp on his guitar all the time. When I got in the service they told me to throw that clamp in the corner."

Banister was drafted into the Army and served as a cook. Guitarist Snooks Eaglin took his place in Sugar Boy and the Chapaka Shawee, playing on the Carnival perennial "Jockamo" among other early Chess Records recordings. Banister had lessons from a Mexican guitarist while stationed in El Paso, Texas . "He listened to me play in the B flat tuning and said,'You can't play anything with the guitar tuned like that.' He showed me how to tune the guitar properly." Unlike other New Orleans guitarists, Banister had no background in jazz. He began to play solid body guitars with thin necks. "You could really bend the strings on those. T-Bone Walker and Gatemouth Brown were popular in Texas then and I picked up a lot of their style. T-Bone was a real showman and from him I learned how to do the splits on stage and how to play the guitar behind my head. In El Paso, I played at the Black and Tan Club and sometimes over the border in Juarez." Banister was by this time listening to records Mickey Baker, Pete "Guitar" Lewis, and Wayne Bennett played on, incorporating aspects of their styles into his own technique.

== Career ==
Banister returned to New Orleans when he got out of the service, taking over his old job with Sugar Boy. The band was booked into clubs and gambling joints run by alleged mobsters. "All our work was white clubs- that's why I left Sugar Boy around 1956. We couldn't eat, drink, or sit down in those places. We couldn't even use the bathroom. I got a job with Eddie Bo who was on the road doing all black clubs. We had to sleep six to a room in boarding houses sometimes, but at least we didn't have to worry about going to jail most of the time." Bo's rhythm and blues band included drummer Walter "Popee" Lastie, tenor sax men David Lastie and Robert Parker, and Banister on guitar. The group worked for Shaw Booking Agency out of New York, touring as the show band with Amos Milburn, Charles Brown, Little Willie John, and Ruth Brown. Banister was the guitarist when Eddie Bo recorded his "I'm Wise", a hit in New Orleans that Little Richard later covered as "Slippin' And Slidin". Banister considered Bo's mid-1950s band as one of the best to ever come out of New Orleans.

After things slowed down for Eddie Bo's band, Banister left to join Danny White and the Cavaliers in 1959. "I fit in pretty good with the Cavaliers because they were doing a lot of the same material that Bo was doing", he said. Their early Sunday morning gig at the Dream Room on Bourbon Street was the band's most popular. "Mac Rebennack used to come in there a lot and watch me play", Banister remembered. "He used me on some sessions but I don't remember the artists. I do remember playing on some country sessions, which blew some minds, but I learned to play that stuff in Texas." White cut a down-tempo version of "Kiss Tomorrow Goodbye", written by Al Reed. The session was produced by adept arranger Wardell Quezergue, who recorded the renowned guitar part from Irving Banister and background singing by Wanda Rouzan and her sisters. The record scraped the bottom of the Billboard charts but failed to take off nationwide. The song was a favorite in New Orleans, whose residents could not understand why it wasn't a hit. Walter "Wolfman" Washington was a young guitarist in Irma Thomas' band who looked up to Banister. "I met Irving way back in the Dew Drop days. I had a chance to see him playing with Danny White at the Sho-Bar (on Bourbon Street). He was very sure about all the things that he did, and I started watching him and paying attention to how he was projecting. To hang with it as long as Irving has it's got to be in your blood." Another young guitarist who learned from Banister was Ernie Vincent. He recalled Banister tutoring him after his gigs. "I used to go by his house when he got off of work." Vincent added, "He was the first guy that took me on Bourbon Street. I started picking up a lot of stuff from him. He's showing me all the chords. He's the first one showed me how to do a major 7 chord that was working." He noted Banister's technique. "He does minor solos against major scales." Vincent continued "I liked his style. He was very influential in my life."

In the mid-1960s dates at white clubs dried up. Owners worried that R&B bands would attract black patrons who would scare off their white audiences. The British Invasion had begun to dominate radio play and gigs were harder to find. Ironically British musicians, who adulated black R&B, pushed established R&B artists from American radio airwaves. Author Rick Coleman wrote, "There was a strange, distorted reflection taking place, as British groups brought R&B back to America." White American groups also began to freely copy black idioms. When club dates dried up, Danny White disbanded the Cavaliers in 1966. Irving Banister returned to Sugar Boy Crawford's band. Crawford was attempting to restart his career, after a beating by Louisiana State Police left him out of action for two years. Sugar Boy's comeback was brief. Banister said, "He couldn't sing the fast numbers anymore so he retired." After 1969 Sugar Boy sang only in church.

"That's when I started Irving Banister and the All Stars. I took some of the guys from Sugar Boy's band. For a while I had Smokey Johnson on drums and George Porter, Jr. on bass, but George took a job with Art Neville." Porter told interviewer Chris Robie, "I was playing with a band called Irving Banister & the All Stars. Irving Banister was the guitar player who played this famous solo on a Danny White song, 'Kiss Tomorrow Goodbye'. Irving's fame in New Orleans was huge." Banister recalled, "I picked up freelance gigs with other bands when the All Stars weren't working. I've worked with local artists like Johnny Adams, Irma Thomas, Ernie K-Doe, and touring acts like Solomon Burke."

Robert Fontenot, Jr. of the Ponderosa Stomp wrote of Banister and the All Stars, "Lack of fame never stopped Bannister (sic) from keeping the spirit of traditional New Orleans rhythm and blues alive, and his band lives up to its billing by consistently featuring some of the finest musicians in the city."

== Personal life ==
Banister and wife Littdell "Queen Bee" Banister were the parents of Cassandra, Terry, and Irving "Honey" Banister Jr., Big Chief of the Creole Wild West Mardi Gras Indians. Littdell was married to Irving Sr. at age 16. Her husband, she said, never took interest in being a masking Indian; she started in the tradition a year after their son, Irving "Honey" Banister Jr., joined as chief scout in 1971.

Banister's last known recording was an appearance on son Honey's band Cha Wa's 2016 debut "Funk and Feathers". Irving Banister, Sr. died December 15, 2020. He is buried in Holt Cemetery in New Orleans, Louisiana.
