= Forrest Gump: The Soundtrack =

1994 soundtrack album by various artists

Soundtrack album by Various Artists
- Released: June 28, 1994 (US)
- Recorded: 1956–1994
- Genres: Pop; rock; country; soul; psychedelic rock; pop; rock and roll; rockabilly
- Length: 1:45:14
- Labels: Paramount, Epic Soundtrax
- Producers: Robert Zemekis (exec.); Joel Sill (exec.); Glen Brunman (exec.); Alan Silvestri

Professional ratings
Review scores
Source	Rating
AllMusic	4.5/5 stars
Music Week	3/5 stars
NME	7/10

Forrest Gump: The Soundtrack is the soundtrack album for the 1994 Academy Award-winning Tom Hanks film Forrest Gump, and contains music from many well-known American artists. The score, composed by Alan Silvestri, was released separately (as Forrest Gump – Original Motion Picture Score) on the same day. The album was reissued in 2001 with two additional tracks, namely "Running on Empty" by Jackson Browne and "Go Your Own Way" by Fleetwood Mac.

Reflecting on compiling the soundtrack, the film's music producer Joel Sill stated "We wanted to have very recognizable material that would pinpoint time periods, yet we didn't want to interfere with what was happening cinematically." According to Sill, director Robert Zemeckis requested all the music in the film to be from American artists because he thought that was the only kind of music that the main character, the titular Forrest Gump, would buy, further stating "All the material in there is American. Bob (Zemeckis) felt strongly about it. He felt that Forrest wouldn't buy anything but American."

== Commercial performance ==
The soundtrack jumped from number 34 to 7 on the Billboard 200 albums chart on July 30, 1994. The next week on August 6, 1994, it moved from number 7 to 3, staying there for one week. It reached its peak position of number 2 on the chart on August 13, 1994, staying there for seven weeks until September 17, 1994, when it was displaced by the soundtrack of The Lion King. The Forrest Gump soundtrack dropped from the charts on October 15, 1994. In Canada, it reached number one for one week in September 1994.

== Track listing ==
=== Disc one ===
No.	Title	Writer(s)	Artist(s)	Length
1.	"Hound Dog (1956)"	Michael Stoller (music); Jerome Lieber (lyrics)	Elvis Presley	2:16
2.	"Rebel Rouser (1958)"	Duane Eddy; Lee Hazlewood	Duane Eddy	2:21
3.	"(I Don't Know Why) But I Do" (1961)"	Paul Gayten; Bobby Charles	Clarence "Frogman" Henry	2:18
4.	"Walk Right In (1962)"	Gus Cannon; Hosea Woods	The Rooftop Singers	2:33
5.	"Land of 1000 Dances (1966)"	Chris Kenner	Wilson Pickett	2:25
6.	"Blowin' in the Wind (1976)"	Bob Dylan	Joan Baez	2:49
7.	"Fortunate Son (1969)"	John Fogerty	Creedence Clearwater Revival	2:18
8.	"I Can't Help Myself (Sugar Pie Honey Bunch)" (1965)"	Edward James Holland, Jr.; Brian Holland; Lamont Dozier	The Four Tops	2:43
9.	"Respect (1967)"	Otis Redding	Aretha Franklin	2:27
10.	"Rainy Day Women #12 & 35 (1966)"	Bob Dylan	Bob Dylan	4:35
11.	"Sloop John B (1966)"	Traditional, arranged by Brian Wilson	The Beach Boys	2:56
12.	"California Dreamin' (1965)"	Michelle Phillips; John Phillips	The Mamas & the Papas	2:39
13.	"For What It's Worth (1966)"	Stephen Stills	Buffalo Springfield	2:38
14.	"What the World Needs Now Is Love (1965)"	Burt Bacharach (music); Hal David (lyrics)	Jackie DeShannon	3:13
15.	"Break on Through (To the Other Side) (1967)"	Jim Morrison; Robby Krieger; Ray Manzarek; John Densmore	The Doors	2:28
16.	"Mrs. Robinson (1968)"	Paul Simon	Simon & Garfunkel	3:51
Total length:				46:39

=== Disc two ===
No.	Title	Writer(s)	Artist(s)	Length
1.	"Volunteers (1969)"	Marty Balin; Paul Kantner	Jefferson Airplane	2:04
2.	"Get Together (1967)"	Chet Powers	The Youngbloods	4:37
3.	"San Francisco (Be Sure to Wear Flowers in Your Hair) (1967)"	John Phillips	Scott McKenzie	2:58
4.	"Turn! Turn! Turn! (To Everything There Is a Season) (1965)"	Pete Seeger	The Byrds	3:54
5.	"Medley: Aquarius/Let the Sunshine In (1969)"	Galt MacDermot (music); James Rado (music and lyrics); Gerome Ragni (lyrics)	The 5th Dimension	4:48
6.	"Everybody's Talkin' (1969)"	Fred Neil	Harry Nilsson	2:44
7.	"Joy to the World (1971)"	Hoyt Axton	Three Dog Night	3:16
8.	"Stoned Love (1970)"	Frank Wilson; Kenny Thomas	The Supremes	2:59
9.	"Raindrops Keep Fallin' on My Head (1969)"	Burt Bacharach (music); Hal David (lyrics)	B. J. Thomas	3:00
10.	"Mr. President (Have Pity on the Working Man) (1974)"	Randy Newman	Randy Newman	2:46
11.	"Sweet Home Alabama (1974)"	Ronnie Van Zant; Ed King; Gary Rossington	Lynyrd Skynyrd	4:43
12.	"Running on Empty (1977)"	Jackson Browne	Jackson Browne	4:56
13.	"It Keeps You Runnin' (1976)"	Michael McDonald	The Doobie Brothers	4:13
14.	"I've Got to Use My Imagination (1973)"	Gerry Goffin; Barry Goldberg	Gladys Knight & the Pips	3:30
15.	"Go Your Own Way (1977)"	Lindsay Buckingham	Fleetwood Mac	3:39
16.	"On the Road Again" (1980)"	Willie Nelson	Willie Nelson	2:29
17.	"Against the Wind" (1980)"	Bob Seger	Bob Seger & the Silver Bullet Band	5:33
18.	"Forrest Gump Suite" (1994)"	Alan Silvestri	Alan Silvestri	8:48
Total length:				58:32

Note: Tracks 12 and 15 on Disc 2 are additional bonus tracks on the 2001 Collector's Edition CD.

== Additional songs ==
Songs in the movie but not on the soundtrack include:

1. "Lovesick Blues" – Hank Williams
2. "Sugar Shack" – Jimmy Gilmer and the Fireballs
3. "Hanky Panky" – Tommy James and the Shondells
4. "All Along the Watchtower" – The Jimi Hendrix Experience
5. "Soul Kitchen" – The Doors
6. "Hello, I Love You" – The Doors
7. "People Are Strange" – The Doors
8. "Hey Joe" – The Jimi Hendrix Experience
9. "Where Have All the Flowers Gone?" – Pete Seeger
10. "Love Her Madly" – The Doors
11. "Let's Work Together" – Canned Heat
12. "Tie a Yellow Ribbon Round the Ole Oak Tree" – Tony Orlando & Dawn
13. "Get Down Tonight" – KC & the Sunshine Band
14. "Free Bird" – Lynyrd Skynyrd

John Lennon's song "Imagine" is mentioned and has its lyrics quoted, but was not used in the film.

== Charts ==
=== Weekly charts ===
Weekly chart performance for Forrest Gump: The Soundtrack
Chart (1994–1995)	Peak position
Australian Albums (ARIA)	1
Austrian Albums (Ö3 Austria)	4
Belgian Albums (Ultratop Wallonia)	45
Canada Top Albums/CDs (RPM)	1
Dutch Albums (Album Top 100)	56
German Albums (Offizielle Top 100)	10
Hungarian Albums (MAHASZ)	36
New Zealand Albums (RMNZ)	1
Norwegian Albums (VG-lista)	4
Scottish Albums (Official Charts)	7
Swedish Albums (Sverigetopplistan)	9
Swiss Albums (Schweizer Hitparade)	10
UK Compilation Albums (Official Charts)	5
US Billboard 200	2

=== Year-end charts ===
Year-end chart performance for Forrest Gump: The Soundtrack
Chart (1994)	Position
Australian Albums (ARIA)	10
Canada Top Albums/CDs (RPM)	12
New Zealand Albums (RMNZ)	15
US Billboard 200	28
Chart (1995)	Position
Australian Albums (ARIA)	5
Canada Top Albums/CDs (RPM)	27
New Zealand Albums (RMNZ)	3
US Billboard 200	31
Chart (1997)	Position
Australian Albums (ARIA)	88

=== Decade-end charts ===
Decade-end chart performance for Forrest Gump: The Soundtrack
Chart (1990–1999)	Position
US Billboard 200	88

== Sales and certifications ==
Region	Certification	Certified units/sales
Australia (ARIA)	11× Platinum	770,000^{^}
Austria (IFPI Austria)	Gold	25,000^{*}
Belgium (BRMA)	Gold	25,000^{*}
Brazil (Pro-Música Brasil)	Gold	100,000^{*}
Canada (Music Canada)	Diamond	1,000,000^{^}
Finland (Musiikkituottajat)	Gold	36,399
France (SNEP)	Gold	100,000^{*}
New Zealand (RMNZ)	Platinum	15,000^{^}
Spain (Promusicae)	Platinum	100,000^{^}
Switzerland (IFPI Switzerland)	Gold	25,000^{^}
United Kingdom (BPI)	Platinum	300,000^{*}
United States (RIAA)	12× Platinum	6,000,000^{^}
^{*} Sales figures based on certification alone.^{^} Shipments figures based on certification alone.

== See also ==
- List of best-selling albums in Australia
- List of best-selling albums in the United States
