= Irma Thomas =

American soul, rhythm and blues, and gospel singer (born 1941)

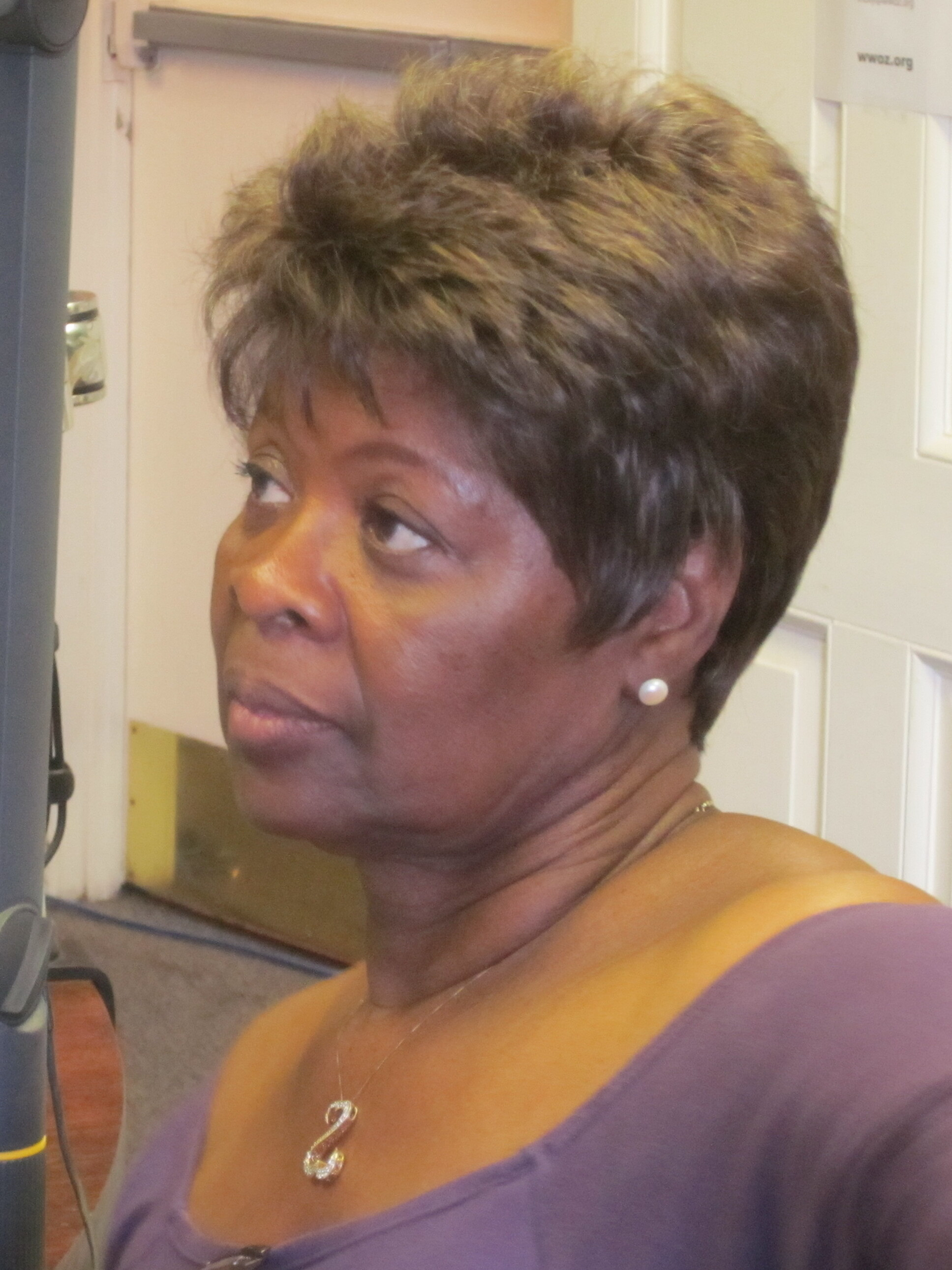
- Thomas in 2011

Background information
- Also known as: Soul Queen of New Orleans
- Born: Irma Lee; February 18, 1941 (age 85); Ponchatoula, Louisiana, U.S.
- Genres: New Orleans R&B; soul blues; gospel; pop
- Occupations: Singer; songwriter
- Instrument: Vocals
- Years active: 1959–present
- Labels: Ron; Minit; Imperial; Chess; Rounder; Maison de Soul

Irma Thomas (née Lee; born February 18, 1941) is an American singer from New Orleans. She is known as the "Soul Queen of New Orleans".

Thomas is a contemporary of Aretha Franklin and Etta James, but never experienced their level of commercial success. In 2007, she won the Grammy Award for Best Contemporary Blues Album for After the Rain, her first Grammy in a career spanning over 50 years.

== Life and career ==
Born Irma Lee, in Ponchatoula, Louisiana, United States, she was the daughter of Percy Lee, a steel chipper, and Vader Lee, who worked as a maid. As a teenager, she sang with a Baptist church choir. She auditioned for Specialty Records at the age of 13. By the time she was 19, she had been married twice and had four children. Keeping her second ex-husband's surname, she worked as a waitress in New Orleans, occasionally singing with bandleader Tommy Ridgley, who helped her land a record deal with the local Ron label. Her first single, "Don't Mess with My Man", was released in late 1959, and reached number 22 on the US Billboard R&B chart.

She then began recording on the Minit label, working with songwriter and producer Allen Toussaint on songs including "It's Raining" and "Ruler of My Heart", which was later reinterpreted by Otis Redding as "Pain in My Heart". Imperial Records acquired Minit in 1963, and a string of successful releases followed. These included "Wish Someone Would Care", her biggest national hit; its B-side "Breakaway", written by Jackie DeShannon and Sharon Sheely (later covered by Tracey Ullman, among others).

"Anyone Who Knows What Love Is (Will Understand)" was co-written by a young Randy Newman and future country star Jeannie Seely. This song has gained renewed appreciation as a result of its inclusion in numerous episodes of the science fiction anthology television series Black Mirror, stretching back to the first season. On its B-side is "Time Is on My Side", a song previously recorded by Kai Winding and later by the Rolling Stones.

Her first four Imperial singles all charted on Billboard's pop chart, but her later releases were less successful. Unlike her contemporaries Aretha Franklin, Gladys Knight and Dionne Warwick, she never managed to cross over into mainstream commercial success. She recorded for Chess Records in 1967–1968 with some success; her version of the Otis Redding song "Good to Me" reached the R&B chart. She then relocated to California, releasing records on various small labels, before returning to Louisiana, and in the early 1980s opened the Lion's Den Club.

Down by Law, the 1986 independent film by Jim Jarmusch featured "It's Raining" in the soundtrack. The film's actors Roberto Benigni and Nicoletta Braschi, whose characters fell in love in the movie, danced to the song.

After several years' break from recording, she was signed by Rounder Records, and in 1991 earned her first Grammy Award nomination for Live! Simply the Best, recorded in San Francisco. She subsequently released a number of traditional gospel albums, together with more secular recordings. The album Sing It! (1998) was nominated for a Grammy in 1999.

Thomas was still active as a performer as of 2021, appearing annually at the New Orleans Jazz & Heritage Festival (and was scheduled to appear at the iterations that were canceled due to the COVID-19 pandemic). She reigned as Queen of the Krewe du Vieux for the 1998 New Orleans Mardi Gras season. She often headlined at her own club, but it went out of business due to Hurricane Katrina, which caused her to relocate to Gonzales, Louisiana, 60 miles (97 km) from New Orleans. As of April 2008 she was back in her home in New Orleans.

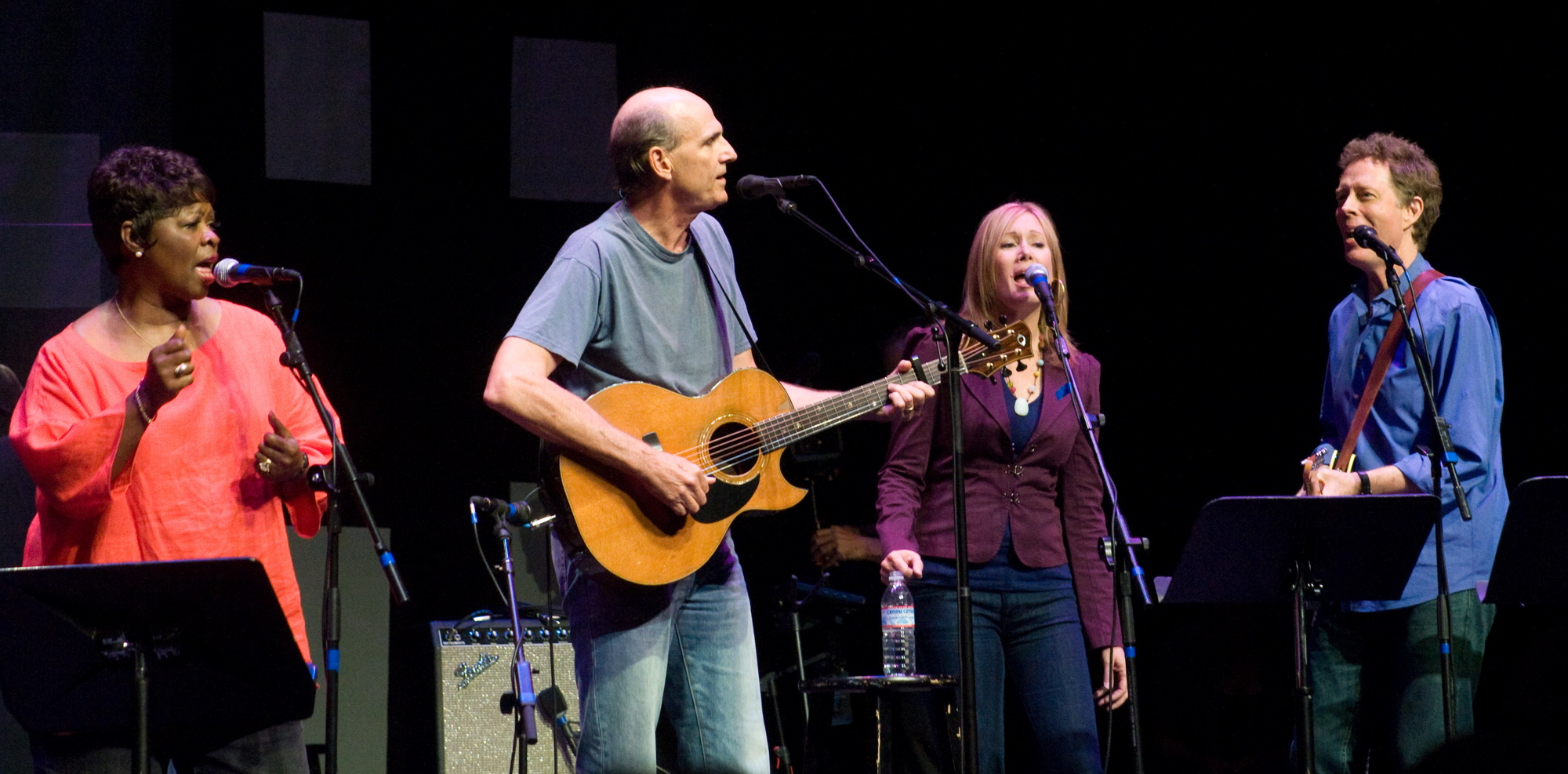
Thomas appearing with James Taylor and others in 2008

Thomas is interviewed on screen and appears in performance footage in the 2005 documentary film Make It Funky!, which presents a history of New Orleans music and its influence on rhythm and blues, rock and roll, funk and jazz. In the film, she performed "Old Records" with Allen Toussaint.

In April 2007, Thomas was honored for her contributions to Louisiana music with induction into the Louisiana Music Hall of Fame. Also in 2007, Thomas accepted an invitation to participate in Goin' Home: A Tribute to Fats Domino where, singing with Marcia Ball, she contributed "I Just Can't Get New Orleans Off My Mind". The same year she won the Grammy Award for Best Contemporary Blues Album for After the Rain.

In August 2009, a compilation album with three new songs titled The Soul Queen of New Orleans: 50th Anniversary Celebration was released from Rounder Records to commemorate Thomas' 50th year as a recording artist.

Thomas was the subject of the 2008 New Orleans Jazz & Heritage Festival poster. She was chosen as the subject before the painting was chosen for the poster. Artist Douglas Bourgeois painted the singer in 2006. In 2010, Thomas rode in the New Orleans parade "Grela". In April that year, Thomas performed at the Corner Hotel, Richmond, Victoria, Australia.

In 2011, Thomas performed twice at the Byron Bay Bluesfest in Byron Bay, New South Wales, Australia. On April 24, she performed on the Crossroads stage, coming on after Mavis Staples; then on April 25, she headlined the Crossroads stage, coming on after Jethro Tull and Osibisa.

In 2013, Thomas was nominated for a Blues Music Award in the "Soul Blues Female Artist" category, which she duly won. She won the same award in 2014.

In 2018, Thomas received the Lifetime Achievement Award for Performance at the Americana Music Honors & Awards.

On May 2, 2024, Thomas appeared onstage with the Rolling Stones at the New Orleans Jazz & Heritage Festival where she and Mick Jagger sang a duet of her 1964 hit song "Time Is On My Side", which the Stones also recorded just months after her version was released. The song was the Stones' first Top Ten American hit, and the Jazz Fest set was the first time that Thomas and the Stones have performed together.

In 2025, Thomas's album Audience with the Queen came out with Galactic, the New Orleans electro-funkers.

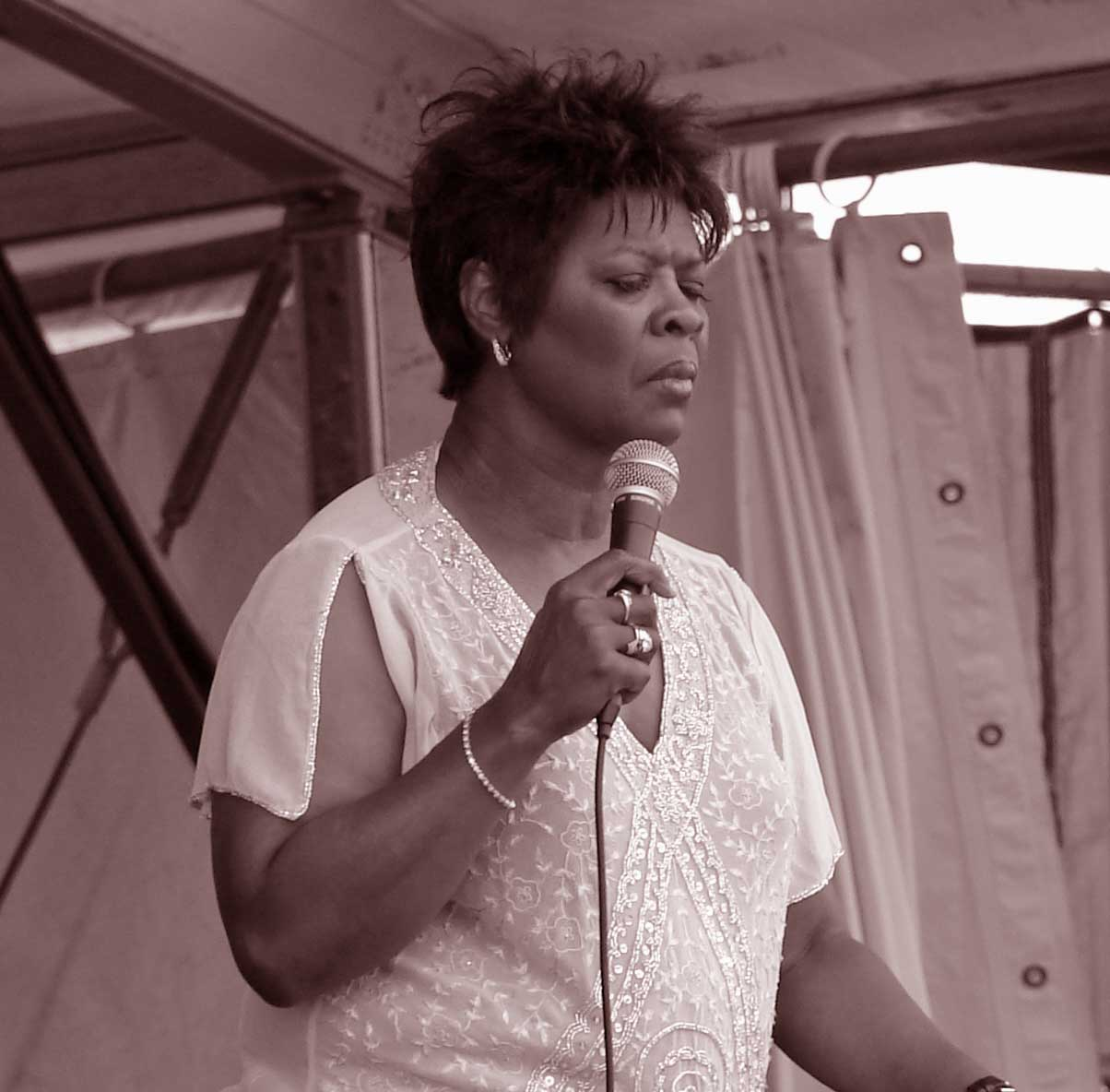
Irma Thomas in concert in 2006

=== Artists worked with ===
- Tommy Ridgley
- Eddie Bo
- Edgar Blanchard
- Bill Sinigal
- Irving Banister
- Patsy Vidalia
- Marcia Ball
- Dr. John
- Allen Toussaint
- Hugh Laurie
- Skip Easterling
- Danny White

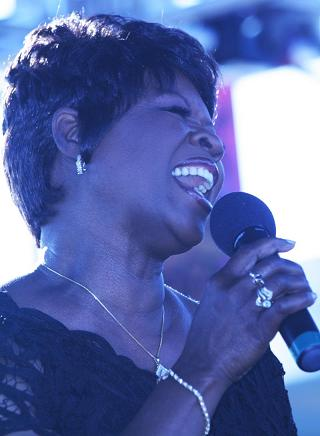
Thomas in 2008

=== Influences ===
- Etta James
- Mahalia Jackson
- Pearl Bailey
- Nancy Wilson
- Brook Benton
- John Lee Hooker
- Percy Mayfield

== Discography ==
=== Singles ===
Year	A-side	B-side	Record label and catalog reference	US chart statistics
1959	"Don't Mess with My Man"	"Set Me Free"	Ron Records 328	No. 22 – R&B
1959	"A Good Man"	"I May Be Wrong"	Ron Records 330	
1961	"Girl Needs Boy"	"Cry On"	Minit Records 625	
1961	"It's Too Soon to Know"	"That's All I Ask"	Minit Records 633	
1962	"Gone"	"I Done Got Over It"	Minit Records 642	
1962	"It's Raining"	"I Did My Part"	Minit Records 653	
1962	"Two Winters Long"	"Somebody Told Me"	Minit Records 660	
1963	"Ruler of My Heart"	"Hittin' on Nothing"	Minit Records 666	
1963	"For Goodness Sake"	"Whenever (Look Up)"	Bandy Records 368	
1963	"Foolish Girl"	"When I Met You"	Bumpa Records 711	
1964	"Wish Someone Would Care"	"Break-A-Way"	Imperial Records 66013	No. 17 – Pop; No. 2 – R&B
1964	"Anyone Who Knows What Love Is (Will Understand)"	"Time Is on My Side"	Imperial Records 66041	No. 52 – Pop; No. 29 – R&B
1964	"Times Have Changed"	"Moments to Remember"	Imperial Records 66069	No. 98 – Pop; No. 30 – R&B
1964	"He's My Guy"	"(I Want A) True, True Love"	Imperial Records 66080	No. 63 – Pop; No. 24 – R&B
1965	"You Don't Miss a Good Thing (Until It's Gone)"	"Some Things You Never Get Used To"	Imperial Records 66095	No. 109 – Pop
1965	"I'm Gonna Cry Till My Tears Run Dry"	"Nobody Wants to Hear Nobody's Troubles"	Imperial Records 66106	No. 130 – Pop
1965	"The Hurt's All Gone"	"It's Starting to Get to Me Now"	Imperial Records 66120	
1965	"Take a Look"	"What Are You Trying to Do"	Imperial Records 66137	No. 118 – Pop
1966	"It's a Man's – Woman's World (Part 1)"	"It's a Man's – Woman's World (Part 2)"	Imperial Records 66178	No. 119 – Pop
1967	"Cheater Man"	"Somewhere Crying"	Chess Records 2010	
1967	"A Woman Will Do Wrong"	"I Gave You Everything"	Chess Records 2017	
1968	"Good to Me"	"We Got Something Good"	Chess Records 2036	No. 42 – R&B
1970	"Save a Little Bit for Me"	"That's How I Feel About You"	Canyon Records 21	
1971	"I'd Do It All Over You"	"We Won't Be in Your Way Anymore"	Canyon Records 31	
1972	"Full Time Woman"	"She's Taking My Part"	Cotillion Records 41444	
1973	"She'll Never Be Your Wife"	"You're the Dog"	Fungus Records 15119	
1973	"In Between Tears (Part 1)"	"In Between Tears (Part 2)"	Fungus Records 15141	
1974	"Coming from Behind (Part 1)"	"Coming from Behind (Part 2)"	Fungus Records 15353	
1977	"Don't Blame Him"	"Breakaway"	Maison de Soul 1012	
1978	"Hip Shakin' Mama"	"Hittin' on Nothin'"	Maison de Soul 1058	
1979	"Safe With Me"	"Zero Willpower"	RCS Records 1006	
1980	"Take What You Find"	"I Can't Help Myself (Sugar Pie Honey Bunch)"	RCS Records 1008	
1980	"A Woman Left Lonely"	"Dance Me Down Easy"	RCS Records 1010	
1981	"Looking Back"	"Don't Stop"	RCS Records 1013	
1988	"Mardi Gras Mambo"	"I Believe Saints Go All the Way"	Sound of New Orleans 10311	
2013	"For the Rest of My Life"	"Forever Young"	Swamp Island	

=== Albums ===
Year	Title	Record label	Notes
1964	Wish Someone Would Care	Imperial	
1966	Take a Look	Imperial	
1973	In Between Tears	Fungus	
1977	Irma Thomas Live – New Orleans Jazz & Heritage Festival	Island	
1978	Soul Queen of New Orleans	Maison de Soul	
1979	Safe with Me	RCS	
1981	In Between Tears	Charly	Reissue of the Fungus LP
1981	Hip Shakin' Mama	Charly	Reissue of the Island LP
1984	Down at Muscle Shoals	Chess/P-Vine	from 1967/68 for Chess
1986	The New Rules	Rounder	
1988	The Way I Feel	Rounder	
1991	Live: Simply the Best	Rounder	
1992	True Believer	Rounder	
1993	Walk Around Heaven: New Orleans Gospel Soul	Rounder	
1993	Turn My World Around	Shanachie	
1997	The Story of My Life	Rounder	
1998	Sing It!	Rounder	with Marcia Ball and Tracy Nelson
2000	My Heart's in Memphis: The Songs of Dan Penn	Rounder	
2006	After the Rain	Rounder	Grammy winner, Best Contemporary Blues Album
2008	Simply Grand	Rounder/Decca	
2014	Full Time Woman – The Lost Cotillion Album	RGM/Rhino	from 1971/72 for Atlantic/Cotillion
2025	Audience with the Queen	Tchoup-Zilla Records	Collaboration with Galactic

=== Compilation albums ===
Year	Title	Record label	Notes
1979	Irma Thomas Sings	Bandy	Minit/Bandy recordings
1983	Time Is on My Side	Kent	Minit/Imperial recordings
1986	Break-A-Way: The Best of Irma Thomas	Legendary Masters Series (EMI-USA)	
1987	BreakaWay	Stateside	Minit/Imperial recordings
1990	Something Good: The Muscle Shoals Sessions	MCA/Chess	Chess recordings
1991	Safe with Me/Irma Thomas Live	Paula	
1992	Time Is on My Side: The Best of Irma Thomas Volume 1	EMI-USA	Minit/Imperial
1996	Ruler of Hearts	Charly	Minit/Bandy/Island
1996	Sweet Soul Queen of New Orleans: The Irma Thomas Collection	Razor & Tie	Minit/Imperial
1996	Time Is on My Side	Kent	Expanded version of 1983 LP
2001	If You Want It, Come and Get It	Rounder	
2005	Straight from the Soul	Stateside	Minit/Imperial
2006	A Woman's Viewpoint: The Essential 1970s Recordings	Ace	Fungus/Canyon/RCS
2006	Wish Someone Would Care/Take a Look	Collectables	Imperial
2009	The Soul Queen of New Orleans: 50th Anniversary Celebration	Rounder	Three previously unreleased, out of fifteen tracks

=== Guest appearances ===
Year	Title	Artist	Label	Notes
1993	Blues Summit	B.B. King	MCA	Duet on "We're Gonna Make It"
2005	I Believe to My Soul	Various artists	Rhino	Singing "Loving Arms"
2005	Our New Orleans: A Benefit Album for the Gulf Coast	Various artists	Elektra/Nonesuch	Singing "Back Water Blues"
2006	Sing Me Back Home	The New Orleans Social Club	Burgundy/Honey Darling	Duet with Marcia Ball on "Look Up"
2007	Goin' Home: A Tribute to Fats Domino	Various artists	Vanguard	Duet with Marcia Ball on "I Can't Get New Orleans Off My Mind"
2010	Ya-Ka-May	Galactic	Anti-	Vocals on "Heart of Steel"
2011	Let Them Talk	Hugh Laurie	Warner Bros.	Vocals on "John Henry" and "Baby, Please Make a Change"

== Filmography ==
Year	Title	Notes
1978	Always for Pleasure	
2005	Make It Funky!	
2006	New Orleans Music in Exile	
2010	Treme	TV series
