= Katy Taylor =

American figure skater

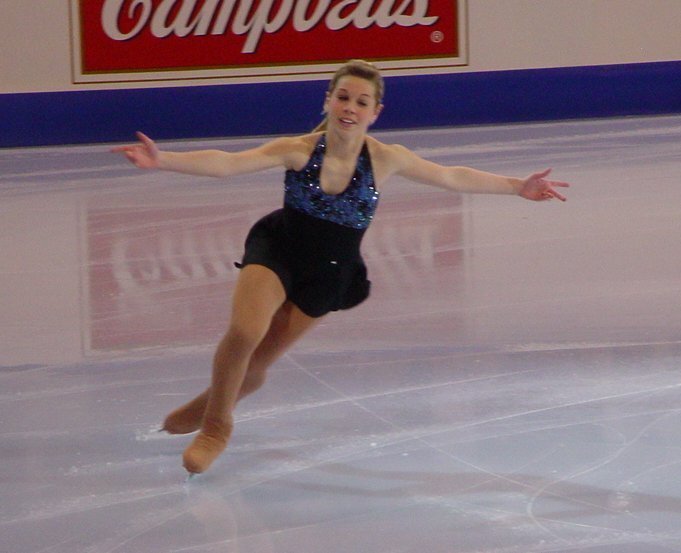
- 2007

Personal information
- Full name: Katy Lynn Taylor
- Born: October 22, 1989 (age 36) Houston, Texas, U.S.
- Height: 5 ft 5 in (1.65 m)

Figure skating career
- Country: United States
- Coach: Jana Conter; Mark Poole
- Skating club: Texas Gulf Coast FSC
- Retired: 2010
Medal record
Ladies' singles Figure skating
Representing United States
Four Continents Championships
Gold medal – first place	2006 Colorado Springs	Ladies' singles
World Junior Championships
Bronze medal – third place	2004 The Hague	Ladies' singles

Katy Lynn Taylor (born October 22, 1989) is an American former competitive figure skater. She is the 2006 Four Continents Champion and 2004 Junior World bronze medalist. She was an alternate to the 2006 Winter Olympic team after finishing fourth at the 2006 United States Figure Skating Championships.

== Personal life ==
Taylor was born in Houston, Texas, to Keith and Tammy Taylor. Her father owns and operates a wholesale floral business. She has one older brother, Brennan. As a child, she participated in a number of activities, including gymnastics, T-ball, soccer, ballet, and tennis. When she was four years old, Taylor told her parents she wanted to be a "pretty famous ice skater."

She attended Mayde Creek Junior High School and Mayde Creek High School. While in school, Taylor was a member of the National Honor Society and the student council and won the Presidential Award for Academic Excellence. Taylor was also a member of the 2007 State Farm/U.S. Figure Skating Scholastic Honors Team. She graduated from high school in 2008. She was considering attending the University of Texas at Austin or another college in Texas, but decided to stay in her hometown and attend the University of Houston.

== Skating career ==
=== Early career ===
Taylor began skating one week before her sixth birthday. When she was eight, she began taking individual lessons with coach Jana Conter. She landed her first triple, a triple loop, when she was 10.

In 2001, Taylor competed on the juvenile level at the U.S. Junior National Championships, which are the national championships for skaters at the juvenile and intermediate level. She finished third. The next year Taylor competed on the intermediate level and finished tenth. In the 2002–2003 season, she moved up to the novice level and qualified for the 2003 U.S. Figure Skating Championships by finishing second at Southwestern Regionals and second at the Midwestern Sectional Figure Skating Championships. At the National Championships, Taylor finished second behind gold medalist Kimmie Meissner. Taylor was then named to the team for the Triglav Trophy, where she won the silver medal on the novice level.

=== 2003–2004 and 2004–2005 seasons ===
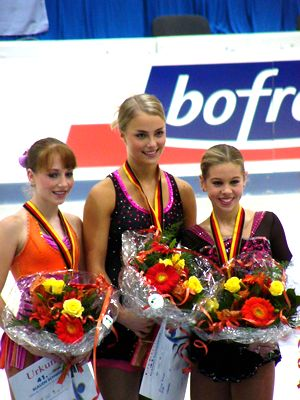
Taylor (far right) won the bronze medal at the Junior Grand Prix event in Chemnitz, Germany, in 2004

During the 2003–2004 season, Taylor moved up to the junior level. She won a silver medal at her first Junior Grand Prix event in Bratislava, Slovakia. In her next Junior Grand Prix event in Japan, she finished fourth. On the national level, Taylor qualified for the 2004 United States Figure Skating Championships by winning the Midwestern Sectional Championships on the junior level. At the National Championships, she finished second to Meissner once again, although she did win the short program. After the event, Taylor was named to the team for the 2004 World Junior Figure Skating Championships. She won the bronze medal, finishing behind Japan’s Miki Ando and Kimmie Meissner.

During the 2004–2005 season, Taylor competed on the Junior Grand Prix once again. She finished third at the events in Budapest, Hungary, and Chemnitz, Germany, but did not qualify for the Junior Grand Prix Final. (Houston Chron 2004) She moved up to the senior level nationally and qualified for the 2005 United States Figure Skating Championships after finishing first at Midwestern Sectionals. At the National Championships, she finished sixth in the short program after hitting all her elements. She ended the competition in ninth place after popping a triple Lutz and falling on a triple Salchow.

=== 2005–2006 season ===
In the fall of 2005, Taylor competed on the Junior Grand Prix again. She finished fourth at the event in Slovakia and second at the event in Bulgaria. Taylor originally was named as an alternate to the Junior Grand Prix Final but later received a last-minute call to the competition in Ostrava, Czech Republic. (Chron 2006) She received the call after competing and winning the Sectionals competition in Denver, Colorado, all while suffering from a cold and sinus infection. Taylor, her coach, and her mother spent 26 hours traveling from Houston to Ostrava and arrived at 7:30 p.m. the day before the event. She placed fourth at the competition, only 3.5 points away from the bronze medal.

In January 2006, Taylor competed at the 2006 U.S. Figure Skating Championships. She placed seventh in the short program after singling the second part of her triple Lutz-double toe combination. In the long program, she skated to the Forrest Gump Suite and had the third highest technical score (54.21). She ended the competition in fourth place after finishing third in the long program. Her final score was 152.54. After the competition, she was named to the Junior World team. U.S. Figure Skating also named her as the second alternate to the 2006 Olympic team. Taylor later dropped out of Junior Worlds after she had skate problems.

After the National Championships, Taylor competed at the Four Continents Championships in Colorado Springs, Colorado, her first senior international event. She won the gold medal after finishing second in both the short program and the long program. During the short program competition, Taylor had to deal with a power outage in the arena that caused a 15-minute delay in the event. She still earned a personal best in the short program. In the long program, Taylor landed five triple jumps, including a triple Lutz at the end of the program. Her only major error was popping a triple loop. Katy still remains the youngest Four Continents Champion winning the competition when she was 16 years and 98 days old.

=== 2006–2007 season ===
As the 2006–2007 season began, Taylor stated that her goals for the year were to qualify for the Grand Prix Final, make the world team, place well at the National Championships and receive a standing ovation. She began the season by winning the bronze medal at the Nebelhorn Trophy in Oberstdorf, Germany, in September. She then competed on the Senior Grand Prix for the first time at Skate America in Hartford, Connecticut and Skate Canada International in Victoria, British Columbia. Before Skate America, Taylor broke in a new pair of skates, which caused her a lot of pain. In the short program, she place eleventh with 34.66 points after falling on her triple flip. She remained in eleventh, and last, place after the long program. A week later, Taylor finished last in the field of 12 at Skate Canada. Taylor believed that her poor results on the Grand Prix series were the result of training, equipment, and personal problems.

After the Grand Prix series, Taylor changed her short program from "Happy Feet" to "Legends of the Fall" so that she would be more comfortable on the ice and more able to tell a story. In December she performed her new short program at the 2006 Marshalls U.S. Figure Skating Challenge in Boston, Massachusetts, an American Idol-style competition in which fans voted for their favorite skating performance. After falling on her triple flip, Taylor did not make it to the final round of the competition.

Taylor's next competition was the 2007 U.S. Figure Skating Championships in Spokane, Washington. Before the competition began, she said that she had resolved the personal and boot problems that had bothered her during the Grand Prix events.

=== 2007–2008 season ===
Taylor did not compete in the 2007–2008 season, citing an injury, and has not returned to competition since.

== Programs ==
Season	Short program	Long program	Exhibition
2006–2007	Legends of the Fall by James Horner "Happy Feet" arranged by John Altman, from Shall We Dance?	"Themes and Variations" by Pyotr Ilyich Tchaikovsky	
2005–2006	"Rhapsody in Blue" by George Gershwin	Forrest Gump Suite by Alan Silvestri	"Perfect Day" by Hoku
2004–2005	"Rhapsody in Blue" by George Gershwin	"Rhapsody on a Theme of Paganini" by Sergei Rachmaninoff	"I Hope You Dance" by Lee Ann Womack "Soak Up the Sun" by Sheryl Crow
2003–2004	Irish medley by Leahy Lakefield	American medley	"I Hope You Dance" by Lee Ann Womack

== Competitive highlights ==
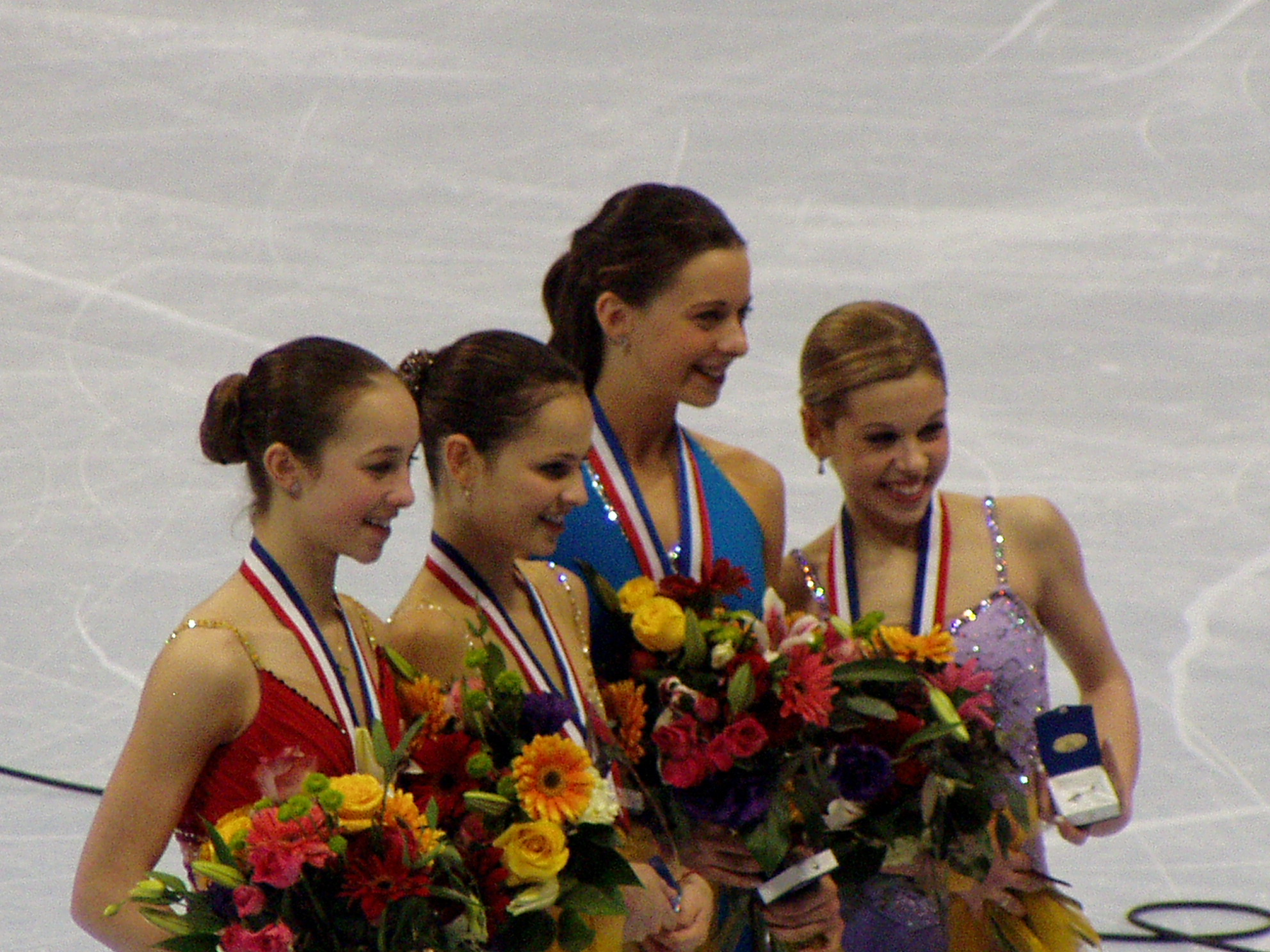
Taylor (far right) with the other 2006 National medalists.

GP: Grand Prix; JGP: Junior Grand Prix

International
Event	03–04	04–05	05–06	06–07
Four Continents Champ.			1st	
GP Skate America				11th
GP Skate Canada				12th
Nebelhorn Trophy				3rd
International: Junior or novice
World Junior Champ.	3rd			
JGP Final			4th	
JGP Bulgaria			2nd	
JGP Germany		3rd		
JGP Hungary		3rd		
JGP Japan	4th			
JGP Slovakia	2nd		4th	
National
U.S. Championships	2nd J	9th	4th	8th
