= Al Reed =

American musician (1925–1990)

Background information
- Born: Alfred Lloyd Reed, Jr. November 10, 1925; Belle Alliance, Louisiana, U.S.
- Died: March 12, 1990 (aged 64) New Orleans, Louisiana, U.S.
- Genres: Blues; New Orleans R&B; rock and roll; Dixieland jazz
- Occupation: Musician
- Instruments: Piano; vocals
- Years active: 1950s–1960s
- Labels: Axe; Frisco; Instant/Valiant; Imperial
- Formerly of: Ruth & Al

Alfred Lloyd Reed, Jr. (November 10, 1925 – March 12, 1990), known as Al Reed, was an American musician in the 1950s and 1960s, best known for the song he wrote, "Kiss Tomorrow Goodbye", notably performed by Danny White for Frisco Records. This song has since been covered numerous times. He also wrote "Message from Maria" that is frequently covered, notably by Joe Simon in 1968 and David Ruffin in 1969.

== Biography ==
Reed was born in Belle Alliance, Louisiana on November 10, 1925.

=== Career ===
After returning from military service during World War II, he started playing in clubs around New Orleans, Louisiana. Per Reed, in an interview with British music historian John Broven, two prominent clubs where musicians would meet or if musicians wanted to listen to other musicians in the 1950s, they went to the Dew Drop and the Club Tijuana, sometimes spelled Club Tiajuana.

When he first started recording and auditioning songs for artists, Paul Gayten, who had recently signed with Chess Records, had taken an interest in Reed. In 1956, Chess began to take a further interest in New Orleans and kicked it off by signing Paul Gayten, who was an established veteran in the New Orleans music scene, as a talent scout, producer, promotion man, artist and songwriter. However, Dave Bartholomew took immediate action and emphasized immediacy instead the slow, bureaucratic approvals Gayten needed from Leonard Chess in Chicago. Reed went on tour with Roy Brown as one of His Mighty Men in 1956.

Reed's Imperial Records tenure was between 1956-59. By 1957, independent companies were not utilizing recording facilities in New Orleans as much. Thus, Imperial, although still involved, reduced the scale of their activities. In 1956, Imperial had sessions with Fats Domino, Smiley Lewis, Dave Bartholomew, and the pair of Ruth Durand and Al Reed, known as Ruth & Al. The duo recorded "Real Gone Party" / "Hello Baby" (1956) with both songs co-written by Dave Bartholomew and "Real Gone Party" co-written by Reed.

Reed and Wardell Quezergue's work together started at Frisco Records. Quezergue’s first production assignment had been with the small label which was owned by Connie LaRocca and DJ Hal Atkins. Reed's most successful hit "Kiss Tomorrow Goodbye" was recorded during his tenure. The record sold well locally in late 1962, then was leased to Arlen Records (Philadelphia) and started to breakout nationally. The record sold more than 100,000 units peaking on Billboard US Hot 100 Bubbling Under chart on November 10, 1962. However, internal conflict quickly fizzled the momentum. The Reed and Quezergue pair also worked with Willie West, sometimes referred to as Lil Willie West. Willie’s third and last single for Frisco was "Don’t Be Ashamed to Cry" / "Am I the Fool" both written by Reed and arranged by Quezergue. He frequently worked with labelmates, Wanda Rouzan and the Rouzan Sisters.

By 1967, Reed founded his own record label, Axe Records, to release his singles, distributed by Cosimo Matassa's Dover Records. This included the song "99.44% Pure Love", probably inspired by Ivory soap's well-known slogan, "99+44/100% Pure". Under his label, Reed worked with Larry Breaux, who was under contract to Elijah Walker, Yvonne Wise, Diablo.

When "Message from Maria" was released by Joe Simon in 1968, it peaked at No. 75 on Billboard Hot 100 and at No. 31 on Hot R&B Songs, spending four and seven weeks on the charts, respectively.

=== Influences ===
Reed noted that Ray Charles "was the greatest influence on me." Notably, Reed started music school under the G.I. Bill in 1952, during which Charles was recording in New Orleans. Reed was a pianist.

== Personal life ==
Reed had at least three children.

=== Death ===
Reed died in New Orleans, at the age of 64.

=== Legacy ===
Reed is one of few African-American musicians who owned their masters in his time. He setup his publishing company, Chervalin Publishing, in 1957, which has typically co-published with Frisco and is administered by BMI.

Reed's record "Top Notch Grade A" is in the Soulful Records UK R&B Hall of Fame.

== Discography ==
Reed's first record released was "She's Rollin'" in 1955 by Post Records, imprint of Imperial Records.

=== Writing credits ===
- Johnny Fuller - "Deep In My Soul" Imperial (1956) – co-written with Pearl King
- Issacher – "Can This Be Love" Fidelity 3019-19 (1960)
- Danny White - "Kiss Tomorrow Goodbye" Frisco Records 104 (1962)
- Errol Dee - "Love Or Money" Instant Records 3240 (1962)
- Diablo - "White Lighting" / "If You Run" Axe 101 (1966)
- Joe Simon - "Message From Maria" Sound Stage 7 2617 (1968)
- Dave Bartholomew - "Drops of Rain" - co-written with Pearl King (originally 1955, released by Bartholomew 1992)
- Yvonne Wise - "Ding, Dong, Daddy" / "I Need A Shoulder To Cry On" Axe 105 (promo only)

=== Recordings ===
Known credited recordings:

- "She's Rollin'" / "Drops of Rain" Post X2013 (1955) - co-written with Pearl King
- "Hoo Doo" (1955) - co-written with Pearl King (released in 2009)
- "Real Gone Party" / "Hello Baby" Imperial (1956) - with Ruth & Al
- "I'll Be the Bee" Imperial (1957 / promo only) - with Ruth & Al, co-written with Dave Bartholomew
- "P's and Q's" Imperial (1957 / promo only) - with Ruth & Al, written by Ruth Durand and Bartholomew
- "Top Notch Grade A" / "El Rancho Grande" Winner 700 (1957)
- "Two Time Loser" Axe (1959-1961, officially 1999)
- "Roll Over Rover" Axe (1959-1961, officially 2000)
- "Magic Carpet" / "Toying With Love" Instant Records 3231 (1961)
- "One Eyed Monster" / "Ring The Ding Dong Bells" Instant Records 3238 (1962)
- "99 & 44/100 Pure Love" / "Sorry 'Bout That" Axe 103 (1968)

== Works cited ==
- Broven, John (1978). Walking to New Orleans: The Story of New Orleans Rhythm and Blues (3rd ed.). Gretna, Louisiana: Pelican Publishing. ISBN 0-88289-433-1.
