= Patsy Vidalia =

American female impersonator and drag queen

Patsy Vidalia (born Irving Ale; 1921 – August 29, 1982), also known as Jack-Patsy Vidalia, was an American female impersonator, singer and entertainer who was prominent in the social life of New Orleans from the 1940s to 1960s. His second name is given with various spellings, including Valdalia, Valdelar, Valdeler, Vadalia, and Valdia.

He was born in Vacherie, Louisiana, the son of Orelia and Willie Ale. After his father died, he moved to New Orleans with his mother, and became fascinated by the local female impersonators. By the mid-1940s, he was working as a female impersonator in New Orleans clubs. He gave himself the name Vidalia for the type of onion, which according to Cosimo Matassa was also used as a slang term for a man who used prostitutes, and worked with others as one of the Valdalia Sisters. In 1947 he started working at the Dew Drop Inn, the center of the city's black musical scene, at the request of its owner Frank Painia. There, he became the club's resident MC, singer and bartender, and hosted the annual Halloween Gay Ball. He was known as "the Toast of New Orleans".

His theme song was "Hip Shakin' Mama", first recorded by Chubby Newsom. His only recordings, "Rock Me Baby" and "Put Your Hand Over My Heart", made for Mercury Records in Los Angeles in 1953 with saxophonist Plas Johnson, were not successful. However, he was described as "one of the most colorful entertainers in New Orleans for two decades... a wild, over-the-top gay man, who expressed that gayness as a cross-dressing female impersonator... Patsy was not a great singer, but more than made up for it with his showmanship." His performances were an influence on Little Richard, who saw him many times, and other performers including Irma Thomas.

He stopped performing regularly at the Dew Drop in the mid-1960s, to look after his ailing mother. His last public appearance was in 1980. He died at home in New Orleans in 1982.
