= Mutsumi Takayama =

Japanese figure skater

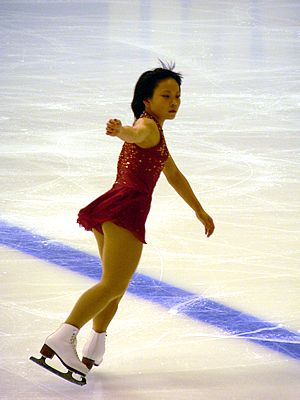
- Takayama in 2005.

Personal information
- Born: January 17, 1991 (age 35) Tokyo, Japan
- Height: 1.48 m (4 ft 10 in)

Figure skating career
- Country: Japan
- Coach: Yuka Kagayama
- Skating club: Meiji Jingo FSC
- Began skating: 1998
- Retired: 2013

Japanese name
- Kanji: 高山 睦美
- Kana: たかやま むつみ
Transcriptions
- Romanization: Takayama Mutsumi

Mutsumi Takayama (高山 睦美, Takayama Mutsumi; born January 17, 1991) is a Japanese former figure skater. She won the 2009 Ondrej Nepela Memorial.

== Programs ==
Season	Short program	Free skating
2007–08	Forrest Gump by Alan Silvestri	The Holiday by Hans Zimmer

== Competitive highlights ==
International
Event	00–01	01–02	02–03	03–04	04–05	05–06	06–07	07–08	08–09	09–10	10–11	11–12	12–13
Nepela Memorial										1st			
Merano Cup										9th			
International: Junior
JGP Austria								11th					
JGP Croatia						4th							
JGP Czech Rep.							14th						
JGP Estonia						8th							
JGP France					4th								
JGP Mexico							4th						
National
Japan Champ.										15th	26th	18th	21st
Japan Junior			15th	8th	9th	8th	10th	12th	19th				
Japan Novice	5th B	4th B	3rd A	2nd A									
