= Edgar Blanchard =

American R&B guitarist, bandleader and arranger

Edgar Vernon Blanchard (August 17, 1924 – September 16, 1972) was an American R&B guitarist, bandleader and arranger who was prominent in the musical life of New Orleans between the 1940s and 1960s.

He was born in Grosse Tête, Louisiana, the son of Elizabeth and Sam Blanchard, and learned to play both guitar and banjo. He was stationed in Europe during World War II, and on his return formed his own band, the Gondoliers, named in memory of his time in Italy. By 1947, he was established as bandleader at the Down Beat club on Rampart Street, New Orleans, with Roy Brown as one of his vocalists and Ernest McLean as a second guitarist.

Blanchard's band was known for his ability to play in a range of styles. They first recorded in Houston, Texas, in 1949, for Don Robey's Peacock Records, but his recordings were not successful and he returned to New Orleans where – with Dave Bartholomew — he was a resident bandleader at the Dew Drop Inn. He recorded with Roy Brown, and performed with other musicians and singers who recorded in New Orleans in the early 1950s, including Big Joe Turner, Ray Charles and Professor Longhair for Atlantic; Lloyd Price and Little Richard for Specialty; and Paul Gayten, Eddie Bo and Clarence "Frogman" Henry for Chess. Though he rarely recorded under his own name, he did record some instrumentals for the Specialty label. His band included saxophonist August "Dimes" Dupont, bassist Frank Fields, pianist Lawrence Cotton, and drummer Alonzo Stewart.

In 1958 he started working for Joe Ruffino's Ric label, as guitarist, arranger, and (briefly) musical director; he backed Johnny Adams on his recordings for the label. He recorded a poorly-received album, Let's Have a Blast with the Gondoliers, issued in 1961, and continued to perform with his band in clubs in New Orleans through to the mid-1960s. His last, untypically raucous, recordings, were made in the late 1960s but were not issued at the time.

He died in New Orleans in 1972, aged 48. He had one son, Edgar Vernon Blanchard Jr., and his wife, Doris Blanchard.
