= Lonely Street =

Lonely Street may refer to:

- "Lonely Street" (Carl Belew song), a 1958 song by Carl Belew
- "Lonely Street" (Clarence "Frogman" Henry song), a 1961 by Clarence "Frogman" Henry
- Lonely Street (Kitty Wells album), 1958, named after the Carl Belew song
- Lonely Street (Andy Williams album), 1959, named after the Carl Belew song
- Lonely Street (film), a 2009 film based on the Steve Brewer novel by the same name
