= Danny White (New Orleans musician) =

American R&B singer and bandleader (1931–1996)

- Danny White

Background information
- Born: Joseph Daniel White; July 6, 1931; New Orleans, Louisiana, United States
- Died: January 5, 1996 (aged 64) Capitol Heights, Maryland, United States
- Genres: Rhythm and blues
- Occupations: singer, band leader
- Years active: c.mid-1950s – c.1970s

Danny White (July 6, 1931 – January 5, 1996) was an influential R&B singer and bandleader who worked in the New Orleans area.

== Early years ==
Joseph Daniel White was born at Charity Hospital in New Orleans, Louisiana, the youngest of seven children. He grew up in the Hollygrove neighborhood and the Seventh Ward. "There was always lots of music around," he explained. "I sang in church and for plays at school. It was really my teachers who thought I had a good voice and encouraged me."

White had his professional debut as a twenty-year-old Marine while stationed at Camp Pendleton in California. He recounted his first appearance fronting a band, "We used to go to this club called the Offshore Lounge to listen to music. It was a nice place, we'd see people like Al Hibbler there. Well, they had a house band and one night the vocalist didn't show. People started asking the band to do requests but they said they couldn't do them without the singer. I got up and said I could do the requests, and I ended up singing the rest of the night." After the show, the owner approached White with an offer of a full-time job. "I told him I couldn't (accept) because I was a Marine." White and the owner reached an agreement in which White sang on weekends for $10 a night.

White returned to New Orleans after he was discharged from the service. "I went back to school on the GI Bill", he said. He also frequented music clubs like Hayes' Chicken Shack, the Shadowland Club, and the Dew Drop Inn. "I got to know a lot of musicians, so me and a guy called Jack decided to start a small band that worked weekends. One of the first places we played was Dupree's Lounge on North Claiborne and St. Bernard Avenue." One busy Saturday night a white man in a Cadillac came to Dupree's and offered White and Jack's band a job at his Golden Cadillac Club on Poland Avenue. The club had previously been a Country and Western venue that the owner wanted to reopen as a R&B club. "He offered to pay us a lot more money than what we were making at Dupree's", White said. "We agreed to work for him and it was our band that actually opened the place up. That was in 1955." The band's appearances on Friday and Saturday nights brought in big white audiences, enough that the club was expanded from 700 to 1000 capacity. After a few months the band broke up when Jack wanted to go back to playing black clubs. White hired new musicians, putting together a six-piece band called the Cavaliers after the cigarettes he smoked.

== Career ==
Danny White and the Cavaliers were a top attraction at the Golden Cadillac. In November 1956 Huey "Piano" Smith took White to Jackson, Mississippi to meet Ace records owner Johnny Vincent. Smith produced and played piano on several uptempo songs White recorded for Ace, including "Let's Play", "Educated Fool", and the rocking "Too Late". None were released at the time. Smith knew White from the Dew Drop. "I thought he was a good singer but Johnny never did anything with him." In 1960 White recorded a single for Dot Records and Nashville record producer Shelby Singleton, "Give And Take" b/w "Somebody Please Help Me". The record failed to chart. White and the Cavaliers left the Golden Cadillac, and began appearing regularly at the Safari club on Chef Menteur Highway and the Dream Room on Canal Street. In 1963, pianist Lawrence Cotton joined Danny White's Cavaliers. "That was another real popular band," said Cotton. "A lot of times we played two gigs a night. We used to play at the Dream Room at four in the morning. All the French Quarter musicians and strippers came by the club. Danny was a hell of an entertainer and he really could sing. Curtis Mitchell (bandleader and bass player) used to listen to every new record that came out and transcribe it to the band. That's how we were up on all the latest sounds and stayed so popular." White's guitarist Irving Banister said, "Danny's records could have been bigger if he was on a national label, and we could’ve toured. We worked only around N.O., and like Sugar Boy (Crawford), we only played at white clubs. We played a lot of Tulane frat gigs, and clubs like the Safari, the Sands, and the Dream Room." Banister continued, "Every night the place was packed. We usually had a job before we played the Dream Room and a lot of people would follow us there."

White's saxophone player John Payne had a second gig at the Sho Bar on Bourbon Street. "I talked with the (Sho Bar) club owner, Sam Anselmo, and gave him my card", White remembered. "He hired me to start a morning jam session that played from 2:00 A.M. to 6:00 A.M. I didn't know if it would work out, but people started following us from our evening gig to the Dream Room and we'd get 300 people in there on Friday and Saturday nights." Anselmo's son, Jimmy, vividly recalled White's early morning sets. "Danny White and the Cavaliers were the hottest band in town at the time", he said. "And they really rocked the place." The Sho Bar's musical history was rich. In the early 1950s Louis Prima was a regular attraction there with his fourth wife, singer Keely Smith. Prima himself had been discovered on Bourbon Street two decades earlier. In 1954 they were called to Las Vegas where, with saxophonist and Bourbon Street veteran Sam Butera, they became regulars on the Las Vegas Strip. By the early 1960s some of the city's top R&B acts performed at the Sho Bar, including Danny White and the Cavaliers, Ernie K-Doe, and King Floyd. Their late-night sets didn't end until the sun was up on Sunday mornings. New Orleans R&B legend Irma Thomas spoke of the part segregation played in black musicians' careers. "Early on, when I was working with Danny White And The Cavaliers, when we got off at Safari Lounge in the east we drove to the Sho Bar Lounge on Bourbon Street. We'd start working there at 2:30 A.M. and I did it about three times and said 'never again'". She left, as she explained, because "I didn't like the accommodations. We were in a four-by-four or a six-by-six room – this is the area they wanted us (black) musicians to stay in when we weren't on stage. I'd already done two shows with Danny White at the Safari and, to me, it wasn't worth it to come down to the Sho Bar for the $12.50 they were paying us. To work from 2:30 A.M. to 7:00 A.M.? I don't think so!"

"Danny was never a big-name recording artist," composer Allen Toussaint said. "But he had a great band that used to work at the Sho Bar on Bourbon Street. Danny inspired me to write 'Mother-in-Law' and 'Certain Girl.' Unfortunately, I wasn't recording Danny, so I gave the songs to Ernie K-Doe." He recalled, "I thought it might be better suited for us to find a different medium, a vocal style more similar to the singing of Danny White, who was very popular in N.O. at that time. So at first I wrote for K-Doe with Danny White's voice in my head, even though I knew K-Doe would sing it. ‘Mother In Law' was a prime example of a song in a Danny White bag." Toussaint added, "There was something very influential about Danny that was absorbed by a lot of artists that had big records here." White spoke of what he did to keep the band working, "We were real professional, we had uniforms and we were disciplined. We played places where they wouldn't hire any other black band."

== Recordings ==
By 1961 Danny White and the Cavaliers were the best paid, and one of the most popular, bands in New Orleans. White told author Jeff Hannusch he was approached by Connie LaRocca, who had just started Frisco Records with her partner WYLD DJ Hal Atkins. "Mrs. LaRocca dropped by the Safari one night and asked me to come by her office. I didn't even think much about recording because we didn't have much time. We only had one night off a week." White visited LaRocca at her office and she introduced him to Al Reed, her writer and arranger. Reed played White a song he'd written called "Kiss Tomorrow Goodbye". "But it was uptempo then and I said if I was gonna cut it I'd slow it down", White said. La Rocca suggested White record the song. "The next week we went down to Cosimo's Studio to cut it. I remember Allen Toussaint played on the session. Well, Cosimo told Connie LaRocca that 'Kiss Tomorrow Goodbye' sounded like a hit." The session was produced by Wardell Quezergue, referred to as "The Creole Beethoven" by Toussaint. He used Irving Banister to supply the stinging guitar licks. The Rouzan Sisters, Laura, Barbara, and Wanda, made their first recording singing back-up on the song. White's own heartfelt vocals assured the record would be a hit. Atkins played it on his radio show and the record rose to number one in New Orleans. "Kiss Tomorrow Goodbye" went on to sell 100,000 copies." Arlen Records of Philadelphia took up the distribution, with the record reaching No. 120 on the Billboard Bubbling Under chart in Nov. 1962. The trade magazine gave it a Pop Spotlight pick: "Danny White bows on the N.O. label with a moving reading of a touching rockaballad. He sells it with warmth, and he can sing.”

White failed to follow up the success of "Kiss Tomorrow Goodbye" with two more Frisco singles. The next disc White recorded, "Loan Me Your Handkerchief", a song written by Earl King, was leased by Frisco to ABC-Paramount for national distribution. This Wardell Quezergue-produced record, featuring Irving Banister on guitar and Mac Rebennack on piano, sold more than 100,000 copies, rising to the top of the local charts. White and the Cavaliers toured with artists such as Jimmy Reed, Otis Redding, and Marvin Gaye. White said "We played the Rockland, the Apollo, all the bigger theatres. Universal booked me." In 1964 Frisco partner Hal Atkins left New Orleans to take a job at WDIA in Memphis. Danny White's sessions were moved to Memphis, where he was produced by Isaac Hayes and David Porter. White remembered, "Hal Atkins was transferred to WDIA up in Memphis and he got to know Jim Stewart, Booker T, and the gang around Stax. He arranged for me to fly up to Memphis" for what turned out to be the last Frisco sessions. "I got with Isaac Hayes and Dave Porter and they recorded me." Hayes and Porter had yet to establish themselves as premier Stax producers so White's first recordings were made at Royal Studios with the musicians who would become the Hi Rhythm Section, including Mabon "Teenie" Hodges on guitar, Howard Grimes on drums, and the Memphis Horns. The discs received little play and few sales.

Connie LaRocca closed Frisco Records in 1966. "Stax used to lease stuff to other labels too, not just put their own stuff out", White said. "They got me a deal with Atlas Records out of New York, and that's when 'Keep My Woman Home' and 'I'm Dedicating My Life' came out in 1966." Because DJs did not play the record, it did not sell. It gained popularity in U.K. discotheques, prompting British label Sue Records to issue it in the U.K., but failed to chart there. Hal Atkins remained a steady supporter of White's talent. He sent White back to Royal Studios to work with producer Willie Mitchell. The resulting two releases, issued in 1966 and 1967, marked White's return to Decca Records. The discs, including a remake of "Kiss Tomorrow Goodbye" had airplay in New Orleans and select other urban areas, though not enough to hit the charts.

== Later life ==
Integration, lack of successful record sales, and the British Invasion led White to disband the Cavaliers in 1966. White club owners had stopped booking black R&B bands because they feared black patrons would alienate their white clientele. R&B was pushed off of radio playlists by British bands emulating their black R&B heroes. In 1968 Allen Toussaint brought White back into the studio to record two sides, "Natural Soul Brother" and "One Way Love Affair", which were released by Nashville record man Shelby Singleton's SSS International with little notice. Two more sides were recorded the following year, possibly in New York City or Washington, D.C., for Kashe Records. By 1969 White had left performing to manage the seminal New Orleans funk band The Meters.

White moved to the Washington, D.C. area in 1972 and worked as a sales manager for a furniture company. He died January 5, 1996, after suffering a stroke. White was survived by his wife and seven children.

== Discography ==
- "Give And Take" / "Somebody Please Help Me" Dot Records 45-16188 (1961)
- "Kiss Tomorrow Goodbye" / "The Little Bitty Things" Frisco Records 104 (1962)
- "Never Tell Your Friend" / "Make Her Mine" Frisco Records 106 (1963)
- "The Twitch" / "Why Must I Be Blue" Frisco Records 109 (1963)
- "One Little Lie" / "Loan Me A Handkerchief" Frisco Records 110 (1963), ABC-Paramount 45-10525 (1964)
- "I've Surrendered" / "Hold What You Got" ABC-Paramount 45-10569 (1964)
- "Moonbeam" / "Love Is A Way Of Life" ABC-Paramount 45-10589 (1964)
- "Miss Fine Miss Fine" / "Can't Do Nothing Without You" Frisco Records 110 (1965)
- "My Living Doll" / "Note on the Table" Frisco Records 114 (1965)
- "I'm Dedicating My Life" / "Keep My Woman Home" Atlas Records 1251 (1966), Atteru Records 2000/1 (1966), Sue Records WI-4031 (1966), Unity Records 1257
- "You Can Never Keep A Good Man Down" / "'Kiss Tomorrow Goodbye" Decca Records 32106 (1966)
- "Cracked Up Over You" / "Taking Inventory" Decca Records 32048 (1966)
- "Another One" unissued (1967)
- "Natural Soul Brother" / "One Way Love Affair" SSS International Records 754 (1968)
- "Never Like This" / "King for a Day" Kashe Records 443 (1969)
