= The Story of My Life (Irma Thomas album) =

Studio album by Irma Thomas
- Released: 1997
- Genre: Blues, soul
- Label: Rounder
- Producer: Scott Billington, Irma Thomas

Irma Thomas chronology
Sweet Soul Queen of New Orleans: The Irma Thomas Collection (1996)	The Story of My Life (1997)	Sing It! (1998)

The Story of My Life is an album by the American musician Irma Thomas, released in 1997. It was her sixth album for Rounder Records.

== Production ==
Recorded in New Orleans, the album was produced by Scott Billington and Thomas. Thomas took her time finding material that she thought was appropriate to her taste and age. Dan Penn wrote three of the album's songs during a visit to the recording studio. "Cried Too Long" was cowritten by Sarah Brown and Lisa Mednick. "Dr. Feelgood" is a cover of the Aretha Franklin song. George Porter Jr. played bass on the album.

== Critical reception ==
Professional ratings
Review scores
Source	Rating
AllMusic	4/5 stars
The Atlanta Constitution	3.5/4 stars
The Encyclopedia of Popular Music	2/5 stars

The Atlanta Constitution noted Thomas's "river-deep gospel voice with the emotion-drenched sounds of classic soul." The Globe and Mail wrote that "Thomas's voice has lost some of flexibility and it has deepened, but she still retains the ability to put over good material." The Times Colonist opined that "Thomas is singing better than ever and lovingly caresses these wonderful songs with a rare intelligence and passion." The Austin American-Statesman concluded that some "material veers toward the supper-club slick, though the all-star rhythm section ... never loses the groove." JazzTimes considered the title track to be "a contemporary power pop ballad." The Boston Globe determined that the album "displays how a relaxed, mature artist can handle a range of material."

AllMusic deemed The Story of My Life "one of Thomas' best latter-day albums."

== Track listing ==
No.	Title	Length
1.	"No Use Talkin'"
2.	"The Story of My Life"
3.	"I Count the Teardrops"
4.	"Cried Too Long"
5.	"Love Don't Get No Better Than This"
6.	"Hold Me While I Cry"
7.	"I Won't Cry for You"
8.	"We All Need Love"
9.	"Get Here"
10.	"Keep the Faith"
11.	"Dr. Feelgood"
