= Ain't Got No Home (Clarence "Frogman" Henry song) =

Single by Clarence "Frogman" Henry
- B-side: "Troubles, Troubles"
- Written: 1955
- Released: December 15, 1956
- Recorded: 1956
- Genre: Rhythm and blues
- Length: 2:23
- Label: Argo
- Songwriter(s): Clarence "Frogman" Henry

Clarence "Frogman" Henry singles chronology
"Ain't Got No Home" (1956)	"Lonely Tramp" (1957)

"Ain't Got No Home" is a song written and originally recorded by American rhythm-and-blues singer and pianist Clarence "Frogman" Henry. It was released as a single in the United States on December 15, 1956.

The first verse of the song is sung in a man's voice, the second in a falsetto and the third in a frog's voice.

In the United States, the song reached no. 3 on one of the Billboard R&B chart and no. 20 on the Billboard pop chart.

== History ==
Clarence Henry used his trademark croak to improvise the song "Ain't Got No Home" one night in 1955. Chess Records' A&R man Paul Gayten heard the song, and had Henry record it in Cosimo Matassa's studio in September 1956. Initially promoted by local DJ Poppa Stoppa, the song eventually rose to number 3 on the national R&B chart and number 20 on the US pop chart. The gimmick earned Henry his nickname of "Frogman" and jump-started a career that endured until his death.

The song was the first big hit released on the Chess subsidiary Argo Records.

It was used in the 1982 film Diner, the 1987 film The Lost Boys and the 1995 Martin Scorsese movie Casino.

== Accolades ==
The song is ranked no. 98 on the NME magazine's list of 100 Best Songs of the 1950s.

== Track listings ==
7" single (1956) – Argo Record Corp., cat. no. Arc Music 5259 (US)

1. "Ain't Got No Home" (2:23)
2. "Troubles, Troubles" (2:15)

7" single (1966) – London Records HLU 10025 (UK), Parrot 45 PAR 10822 (US)

1. "Ain't Got No Home"
2. "Baby Ain't That Love"

== Cover versions ==
The song has been covered by many artists including the Band, Suzi Quatro, Buddy Holly, The Country Gentlemen, the New York Dolls, and Jackie Edwards. In Rod Stewart's version of the song "Some Guys Have All the Luck", Stewart incorporates the vocal refrain from "Ain't Got No Home" as an homage. The song was a favorite of Madeline Kahn, who performed it on Saturday Night Live on December 16, 1995. Steve Miller incorporated some of the vocal lines from the song on the track "Just A Little Bit" on his 1988 Born 2 B Blue album.
