= Lawrence Cotton =

American musician (born 1927)

- Born: February 2, 1927 (age 99); New Orleans, Louisiana, U.S.
- Genres: R&B, jazz
- Occupation: pianist
- Years active: c.1950s – today

Lawrence Cotton (born February 2, 1927) is an American R&B and jazz pianist who performs and lives in New Orleans, Louisiana.

== Early life and education ==
Lawrence Eddie Cotton was born in the 13th Ward of Uptown New Orleans, and has lived there all his life. His father was a dockworker, and amateur pianist who played at house parties. His mother, Edna Mae Lanz, from Baton Rouge, Louisiana, worked as a domestic. Cotton attended elementary school at John McDonogh No. 6 School located at Camp Street and Napoleon Avenue. His older brother Walter James, called W.J. by the family, died at age eight after being run over by a car while playing ball. Cotton attended Hoffman High School. Two of his father's four sisters had pianos and Cotton would go to their houses and play around on their pianos. His father sometimes played at rent parties. Inspired to play piano by his father, Cotton was self-taught until after serving in the Army Air Corps, where he was promoted to sergeant. His enlistment lasted from 1946 to 1949, during which time he married Lillie Mae Tasker.

After his discharge Cotton attended Gruenwald Music School for 18 months, from 1950 through 1951, on the G.I. Bill. Gruenwald faculty members included Louis Barbarin, Frank Federico, Otto Finck, Willie Humphrey, Clyde Kerr Sr., and Wardell Quezergue. The school emphasized the study of the fundamentals of music theory. Many noted New Orleans musicians such as Warren Bell, Al Belletto, Peter “Chuck” Badie, Edgar Blanchard, Eddie Bo, Ernest McLean, Earl Palmer, Robert Parker, Tommy Ridgley, and Alvin “Red” Tyler studied at Gruenwald.

== Career ==
One of Cotton's first professional jobs was substituting for Jeanette Kimball at a gig with Papa French at a private club on Canal Street. Also on that job was "Brother Cornbread" Thomas on clarinet. While still studying at Gruenwald, Cotton got a job for about six months at Happy's Corral in Harvey, Louisiana. There he met Hosea Hill, whose band had also been booked there. His group, the Serenaders, featured Lloyd Lambert on bass. In 1953 Lambert took over as bandleader and the band, under the name of the Lloyd Lambert Orchestra, toured with Ray Charles. Cotton was called to play with Lambert's orchestra when Hosea Hill hired them to tour with Eddie "Guitar Slim" Jones. He backed Guitar Slim from 1954 to 1958, on the road and in the studio. Slim was a notorious drinker and hell-raiser who told him, "Cotton, you're going to outlive me 'cause I'm living two or three days to your one". During his time with Lambert's band, Cotton also performed behind such artists as T-Bone Walker and Big Joe Turner. Tired of the life on the road, he left Guitar Slim and went back to New Orleans in late 1958. Slim died of pneumonia two months later in New York City.

When Cotton returned to New Orleans he joined guitarist Edgar Blanchard's band the Gondoliers. He remembered, "We played at Gordon Natal's on Chef Highway for three years and then went to Mobile." After the Gondoliers broke up in 1963 Cotton began playing in Danny White's Cavaliers, at the time the top R&B band in New Orleans. White's recordings were popular in New Orleans but didn't chart nationally. He disbanded the Cavaliers, a black band that had played in whites-only clubs, in 1966. After integration was enforced white club owners would not book bands that drew blacks, afraid they might frighten off their white patrons. In addition, local radio stations had eschewed R&B in favor of British Invasion bands.

Also in 1966 Cotton got a day job doing clerical work with U.S. Customs, happy to have a regular paycheck and benefits. He retired after 30 years in 1996.

Cotton went to work with Dave Bartholomew's band for ten years. According to Cotton, the band consisted of Dave Bartholomew on trumpet, Warren Payne on sax, Smokey Johnson on drums, and himself on piano. In the early 1970s he went back to the Bourbon Street clubs and played traditional jazz. His longest gig was with trumpeter Wallace Davenport, which included touring in Europe. Cotton had a weekly gig at Preservation Hall, that was interrupted by Hurricane Katrina in 2005. He performs with vocalist Jane Harvey Brown's Trad Jazz All-Stars, featuring her husband drummer Kerry Brown. Kerry Brown and Cotton were bandmates in trumpeter Teddy Riley's jazz outfit.

Cotton also currently fronts his own band, the Lawrence Cotton Legendary Experience.

== Personal life ==
Cotton was married to his wife Lillie Mae, who died in 1997, for over 50 years. He is a lifetime member of Second Baptist Church- Sixth District, where he serves as deacon and trustee.

== Recognition ==
Cotton was named Master Practitioner by the Preservation Hall Foundation in 2019. He is honored with the annual namesake Cotton Fest, with musicians that have included Leo Nocentelli, Deacon John, and Bo Dollis Jr. and the Wild Magnolias. “There's been music all around me ever since I can remember,” Cotton said. He started taking music lessons late in life with teacher Roger Dickinson. Cotton says “He's really brought me up to another level."
