= You Always Hurt the One You Love =

1944 song by Doris Fisher and Allan Roberts

Song

"You Always Hurt the One You Love"

Single by Clarence "Frogman" Henry

from the album You Always Hurt the One You Love
- B-side: "Little Suzy"
- Released: May 1961
- Recorded: 1961
- Genre: R&B
- Length: 2:25
- Label: Argo
- Songwriters: Allan Roberts, Doris Fisher

Clarence "Frogman" Henry singles chronology
"(I Don't Know Why) But I Do" (1961)	"You Always Hurt the One You Love" (1961)	"Lonely Street" (1961)

"You Always Hurt the One You Love" is a pop standard with lyrics by Allan Roberts and music by Doris Fisher. First recorded by the Mills Brothers, whose recording reached the top of the Billboard charts in 1944, it was also a hit for Sammy Kaye (vocal by Billy Williams) in 1945.

It has been performed by many other artists over the years, including Moon Mullican with Cliff Bruner, Connie Francis (number 13 on the UK Singles Chart in 1959, where it had been released as a special "A" side to cater for huge demand for her product), Fats Domino, The Impressions, Molly Nilsson, George Maharis, Frankie Laine, Richard Chamberlain (as the B-side of his single "Rome Will Never Leave You"), Peggy Lee, Maureen Evans, Michael Bublé, Kay Starr, Hank Thompson, Ringo Starr (in his 1970 album Sentimental Journey), and Clarence "Frogman" Henry, whose version became a top 20 hit on the Billboard Hot 100 in 1961. It was also popular in a parody version by Spike Jones. The song was performed by actor Ryan Gosling and featured prominently in the 2010 film Blue Valentine.

== A partial list of singers who have recorded this song ==
- The Mills Brothers, 1944, number 1
- Spike Jones (parody), 1945
- Connie Francis, 1958
- Fats Domino, 1960
- Pat Boone, 1960
- Clarence "Frogman" Henry, 1961, Argo Records (number 4 CAN)
- Paul Anka, 1963
- Hank Thompson, 1964
- Richard Chamberlain, 1964
- The Impressions, 1964
- The Ink Spots, 1964
- Ray Price, 1985
- Willie Nelson, 1993

== The Mills Brothers' version ==
The recording by The Mills Brothers was released by Decca Records as catalog number 18599. It first reached the Billboard Best Seller chart on June 22, 1944, and lasted 20 weeks on the chart, peaking at number one. The Mills Brothers version also reached number five on the Harlem Hit Parade.

The flip side, "Till Then", also charted in the top 10, making the record a two-sided hit.

It was heard twice in the Angel episode "Rm w/a Vu" in two scenes: one where Maude haunts Cordelia and another in a flashback scene in Los Angeles, where Dennis is entombed in the wall of his apartment by the former, his mother, in 1946.

== Spike Jones version ==
Spike Jones' parody of the song is essentially the straight song with most of the parody being in the way the song is presented, in three parts:

1. A slow, deliberate rendering of the first half of the song, with vocal by Carl Grayson, in a style imitating The Ink Spots.
2. A spoken rendering of the second half of the song, by Red Ingle, with elaborations ("honey child, honey doll, honey lamb, honey pie") in a style reminiscent of The Ink Spots's bass singer Orville "Hoppy" Jones.
3. A frantically paced reiteration of the full song, in "Dixieland" style, with vocal again by Carl Grayson, accompanied by shotguns and other typical Jonesian sound effects.

Harry Mills of the Mills Brothers reported not being bothered by the parody, since they were under the same management as Jones and were good friends.

Some artists have covered this version of the song (albeit fewer than have recorded the original standard). Those artists include:

- Stanford Fleet Street Singers on their album 50-Minute Fun Break (1992)
