= Lonely Street (Clarence "Frogman" Henry song) =

Single by Clarence "Frogman" Henry
- B-side: "Why Can't You"
- Released: August 1961
- Genre: R&B
- Length: 2:08
- Label: Argo; 5395
- Songwriter(s): Joe Bisco

Clarence "Frogman" Henry singles chronology
"You Always Hurt the One You Love" (May 1961)	"Lonely Street" (1961)	"On Bended Knees" (October 1961)

"Lonely Street" is a song written by Joe Bisco and performed by Clarence "Frogman" Henry. In 1961, the track reached No. 19 on the U.S. R&B, No. 42 on the UK Singles Chart, and No. 57 on the Billboard Hot 100.
