= (I Don't Know Why) But I Do =

R&B song written by Paul Gayten and Bobby Charles

Single by Clarence "Frogman" Henry

from the album You Always Hurt the One You Love
- B-side: "Just My Baby and Me"
- Released: February 1961
- Studio: Cosimo (New Orleans, Louisiana)
- Genre: R&B
- Length: 2:15
- Label: Argo
- Songwriters: Paul Gayten; Robert Guidry

Clarence "Frogman" Henry singles chronology
"On Bended Knee" (1961)	"(I Don't Know Why) But I Do" (1961)	"You Always Hurt the One You Love" (1961)

Music video
- "I Don't Know Why I Love You But I Do" (live) on YouTube

"(I Don't Know Why) But I Do" is an R&B song written by Paul Gayten and Bobby Charles (as Robert Guidry), and performed by Clarence "Frogman" Henry.

== Original version ==
It was Henry's biggest U.S. hit, reaching No. 4 in early 1961. The B-side on the single release was "Just My Baby and Me".

On its initial release in December 1960, the U.S. release on the Argo record label was titled "I Don't Know Why". However, about ten weeks later, Argo announced that due to confusion arising from the song being mistaken for the 1931 song called "I Don't Know Why (I Just Do)", they changed the name of this song to "But I Do". The UK release on the Pye label and the Australian release on the Coronet label were both titled "But I Do". The UK version spent 19 weeks in the charts and peaked at No. 3 in the first week of May 1961.

The song was made popular again after its use in a 1993 UK television commercial for the Fiat Cinquecento, appearances in the 1994 film Forrest Gump, the 1999 film Mickey Blue Eyes, and a 2019 commercial for Expedia and its ability to provide dog-friendly hotel accommodations.

=== Chart history ===
==== Weekly charts ====
Chart (1961)	Peak position
UK	3
Italy	55
Canada CHUM Chart	2
New Zealand Lever hit parade	6
U.S. Billboard Hot 100	4
U.S. Billboard R&B	9
U.S. Cash Box Top 100	4

==== Year-end charts ====
Chart (1961)	Rank
UK	24
U.S. Billboard Hot 100	43
U.S. Cash Box	39

== Bobby Vinton cover ==
"But I Do"

Single by Bobby Vinton
- B-side: "When You Love"
- Released: December 1972
- Genre: Pop
- Length: 2:21
- Label: Epic
- Songwriter: Paul Gayten/Robert Guidry

Bobby Vinton singles chronology
"Sealed with a Kiss" (1972)	"But I Do" (1972)	"Hurt" (1973)

Bobby Vinton covered "But I Do" in 1972. His version reached No. 82 on the U.S. Billboard Hot 100 and No. 71 on the Cash Box chart in early 1973. It also reached No. 27 on the Adult Contemporary chart.

The song also charted in Canada on both the Pop chart (No. 72) and Adult Contemporary (No. 23) chart, where it made its best showing.

=== Chart history ===
Chart (1972–73)	Peak position
Canada RPM Top Singles	72
Canada RPM Adult Contemporary	23
US Billboard Hot 100	82
US Billboard Adult Contemporary	27
US Cash Box Top 100	71
