= Jimmy Scott =

American jazz singer (1925–2014)

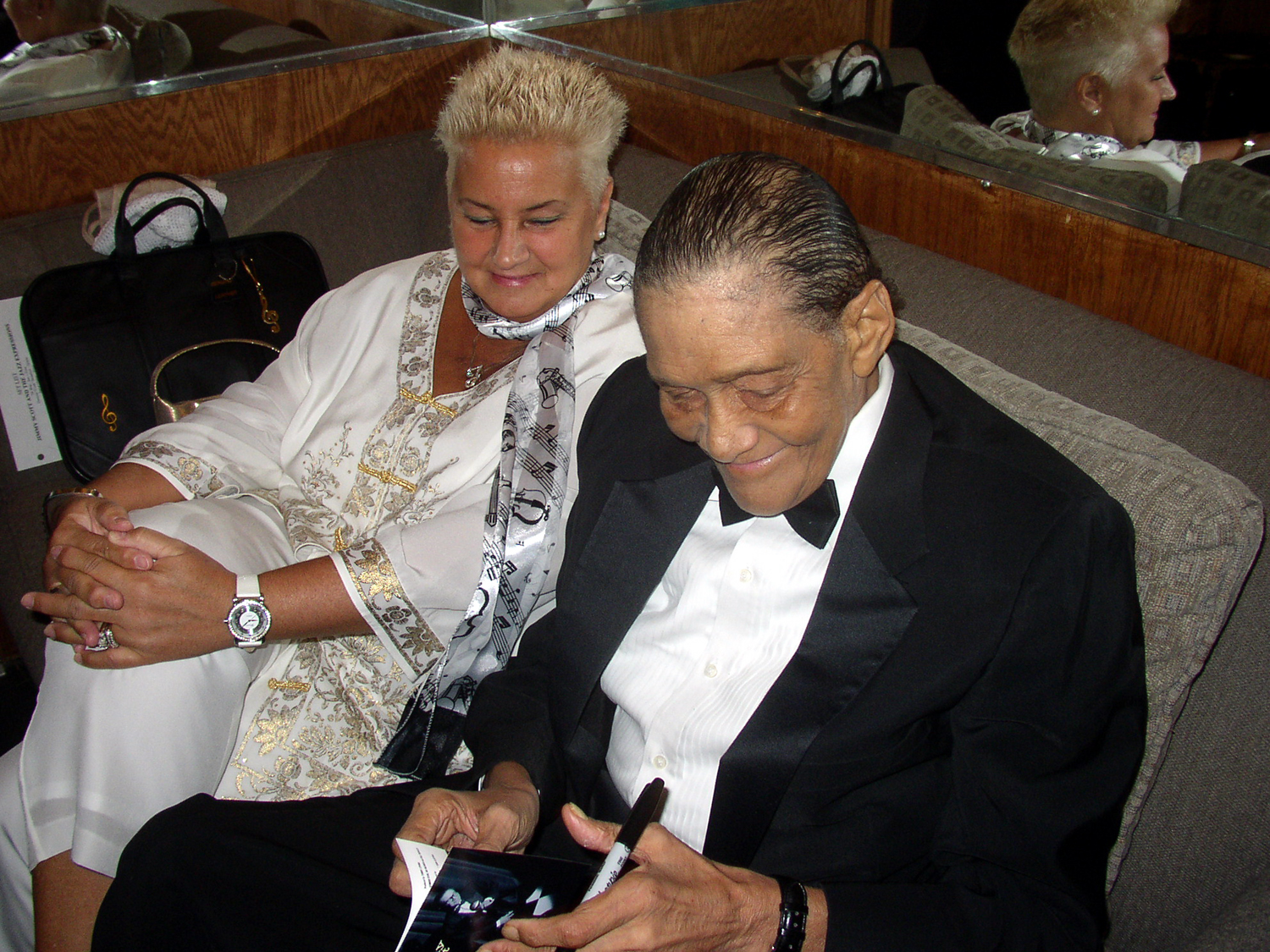
- Jimmy and Jeanie Scott at the Iridium Jazz Club, New York City, September 4, 2004

Background information
- Born: James Victor Scott; July 17, 1925; Cleveland, Ohio, U.S.
- Died: June 12, 2014 (aged 88) Las Vegas, Nevada, U.S.
- Genre: Jazz
- Occupation: Vocalist
- Years active: 1945–2014
- Labels: Savoy; Decca; Roost; Regal; Tangerine; King; Atlantic; J's Way; Sire; Warner Bros.; Artists Only; Milestone; Venus

James Victor Scott (July 17, 1925 – June 12, 2014), also known as Little Jimmy Scott, was an American jazz vocalist known for his high natural contralto voice and his sensitivity on ballads and love songs.

After success in the 1940s and 1950s, Scott's career faltered in the early 1960s. He slid into obscurity before a comeback in the 1990s. His unusual singing voice was due to Kallmann syndrome, a rare genetic disorder that limited his height to 4 feet 11 inches (150 cm) until the age of 37, when he grew by 8 inches (20 cm). The syndrome prevented him from reaching classic puberty and left him with a high voice and unusual timbre.

== Early life ==
James Victor Scott was born on July 17, 1925, in Cleveland, Ohio, United States. The son of Arthur Claude Scott (born Chester Stewart) and Justine Hazel Stanard Scott, he was the third child in a family of ten. As a child, he got his first singing experience by his mother's side at the family piano and later in church choir. He was orphaned at the age of 13, when his mother was killed by a drunk driver.

== Career ==
Lionel Hampton gave him the nickname "Little Jimmy Scott" because he looked young and was short and of slight build. His phrasing made him a favorite of artists including Billie Holiday, Ray Charles, Frankie Valli, Dinah Washington and Nancy Wilson.

He rose to prominence as Little Jimmy Scott in the Lionel Hampton band as lead singer on "Everybody's Somebody's Fool", recorded in December 1949. It became a top-10 R&B hit in 1950. Credit on the label went to "Lionel Hampton and vocalists"; Scott received no credit on any of the songs. A similar event occurred several years later when his vocal on "Embraceable You" with Charlie Parker, on the album One Night in Birdland, was credited to the female vocalist Chubby Newsom.

In 1963, his girlfriend Mary Ann Fisher, who sang with Ray Charles, helped him sign with Tangerine, Charles's label, and record the album Falling in Love is Wonderful. The album was withdrawn while Scott was on his honeymoon because he had signed a contract with Herman Lubinsky; it would be 40 years before the album was reissued. Scott disputed the contract he had with Lubinsky, who had loaned him to Syd Nathan at King for 45 recordings in 1957–58. Another album, The Source, was recorded in 1969, released in 1970, but due to another Lubinsky threat of breach of contract, it was not promoted by Atlantic and quickly went out of print. (It was reissued in 2001).

Scott's career faded by the late 1960s, and he went back to his native Cleveland to work as a hospital orderly, shipping clerk, and elevator operator. He returned to music in 1989 when manager Alan Eichler arranged for him to share a late-night bill with Johnnie Ray at New York's Ballroom. When Scott sang at the funeral of his friend, songwriter Doc Pomus, the event further renewed his career. Scott performed the song "Sycamore Trees" in the climactic final episode of the original Twin Peaks in 1991, and Lou Reed invited him to sing backup on the song "Power and Glory" on Reed's 1992 album Magic and Loss.

Also in attendance at Pomus's funeral was Seymour Stein, founder and operator of Sire Records, which released Scott's 1992 album All the Way, produced by Tommy LiPuma and featuring Kenny Barron, Ron Carter, and David "Fathead" Newman. Scott was nominated for a Grammy Award for the album.

Scott released Dream in 1994, and the album Heaven in 1996. His next work, an album of pop and rock interpretations entitled Holding Back the Years (1998), was produced by Gerry McCarthy and Dale Ashley. Released in the US by Artists Only in October 1998, it peaked at No. 14 on the Billboard Jazz Albums chart. In Japan, it won the Swing Journal Award for Best Jazz Album of the Year (2000). The title track marked the first time in his career that Scott overdubbed his harmony vocal tracks. Holding Back the Years featured cover art by Mark Kostabi, liner notes by Lou Reed, and includes versions of "Nothing Compares 2 U" (written by Prince), "Jealous Guy" (John Lennon), "Almost Blue" (Elvis Costello), "Sorry Seems to Be the Hardest Word" (Elton John and Bernie Taupin) and the title track "Holding Back the Years” (Simply Red).

In 1999, Scott's early recordings for Decca were released on CD, as were all of his recordings with Savoy from 1952 to 1975 in a three-disc box set. In 2000, Scott signed with Milestone and recorded four albums, each produced by Todd Barkan with guests such as Wynton Marsalis, Renee Rosnes, Bob Kindred, Eric Alexander, Lew Soloff, George Mraz, Lewis Nash, and Scott's touring and recording band, The Jazz Expressions. He released two live albums recorded in Japan. During 2003–04, PBS aired If You Only Knew, a documentary produced and directed by Matthew Buzell that won film festival awards and the Independent Lens award.

Scott and his wife Jeanie lived in Las Vegas, Nevada, after purchasing a house in 2006, having previously lived in Euclid, Ohio, for 10 years.

On May 10, 2014, Scott's final recording session took place in the living room of his home. The track was recorded for Grégoire Maret's album Wanted and was a song Maret wrote for him titled "The 26th of May".

== Awards, honors and later life ==
Scott performed at the inaugurations of Presidents Eisenhower (1953) and Clinton (1993). On both occasions, Scott sang "Why Was I Born?".

He received the NEA Jazz Masters award (2007) from the National Endowment for the Arts, the Living Legend Award from the Kennedy Center, the Pioneer Award from NABOB (National Association of Black Owned Broadcasters), and the Lifetime Achievement Award from the Jazz Foundation of America (2010).

Scott's recording of "If I Ever Lost You" can be heard in the opening credits of the 2005 HBO movie Lackawanna Blues. He was also mentioned on The Cosby Show (season 2, episode 25), when Clair and Cliff Huxtable bet on the year in which "An Evening in Paradise" was recorded. On August 17, 2013, at Cleveland State University, Scott was inducted into inaugural class of the R&B Music Hall of Fame.

Scott died in his sleep at his home in Las Vegas on June 12, 2014, at the age of 88. He was buried in Knollwood Cemetery in Mayfield Heights, Ohio. The following month, a portion of East 101st Street in Cleveland was renamed Jimmy Scott Way in his honor.

== Discography ==
=== As leader ===
- Very Truly Yours (Savoy, 1955)
- If You Only Knew (Savoy, 1956)
- The Fabulous Songs of Jimmy Scott (Savoy, 1960)
- Falling in Love Is Wonderful (Tangerine, 1962)
- The Source (Atlantic, 1969)
- Lost And Found (Atlantic, 1971)
- Can't We Begin Again (Savoy, 1975)
- Doesn't Love Mean More (J's Way, 1990)
- Regal Records Live in New Orleans (Specialty, 1991) – recorded in 1950
- All the Way (Sire, 1992)
- Dream (Sire/Warner Bros., 1994)
- Heaven (Warner Bros., 1996) - Title track "Heaven" is a Talking Heads cover that also appears in the film My Sister's Keeper
- Holding Back the Years (Artists Only!, 1998)
- Everybody's Somebody's Fool (Decca, 1999) – recorded in 1949–52
- Mood Indigo (Milestone, 2000)
- Over the Rainbow (Milestone, 2001)
- But Beautiful (Milestone, 2002) – recorded in 2001
- Unchained Melody (Tokuma, 2002) – recorded in 2001
- Moon Glow (Milestone, 2003) – recorded in 2000–01
- All of Me - Live in Tokyo (Venus, 2003) – live

== Filmography ==
=== Documentary ===
- The Ballad of Little Jimmy Scott (DVD) (PBS, 1987), featuring NY Times bestselling author Nathan C. Heard as Narrator
- Why Was I Born: The Life and Times of Little Jimmy Scott (TV) (Bravo Profiles Jazz Masters, Bravo, 1999)
- Jimmy Scott: If You Only Knew (DVD) (Independent Lens, PBS, 2003–2004)

=== Appearances ===
- Soul! (PBS, June 1971)
- Lounge-A-Palooza: "Love Will Keep Us Together" (1997)
- Scotch & Milk (1998)
- Twin Peaks, "Episode 29" (TV) (1991)
- Talent Takes a Holiday (TV) (1992)
- Chelsea Walls (2002)
- Stormy Weather: The Music of Harold Arlen (TV) (2002)
- I Love Your Work (2005)
- Hey, Eugene (2007)
- Be Kind Rewind (2008)
- Passion Play (2011)
