= Chubby Newsom =

American singer

Velma "Chubby" Newsom or Newsome (January 27, 1920 – September 13, 2003) was an American R&B singer who performed and recorded in the 1940s and 1950s.

She was born either in Detroit, Michigan, or perhaps in Alabama before moving to Detroit as a child. She started to establish herself as a singer and dancer in vaudeville, making use of her beauty and voluptuous physique, before moving to New Orleans where she sang in clubs including the Dew Drop Inn. She was discovered there in 1948 by bandleader Paul Gayten, who signed her to De Luxe Records. Her first record, "Hip Shakin' Mama", on which she was backed by Gayten's band, and reportedly by saxophonist Sam Butera, was credited to Chubby "Hip Shakin" Newsom and Her Hip Shakers. Because of a distribution arrangement between De Luxe and Miltone Records, the single was released at the same time on both labels, and in early 1949 reached No. 8 on the Billboard Race Records chart, as the R&B chart was known at the time. The Chicago Defender called her the "singing sensation of 1949".

Newsom made several further recordings for De Luxe, some with Gayten's band and others with the band led by Dave Bartholomew, which included saxophonist Herb Hardesty, guitarist Ernest McLean, bassist Frank Fields, and drummer Earl Palmer. They were less commercially successful than her debut recording, though AllMusic reviewer Bruce Eder described them as "excellent records and some of the most delightfully raunchy New Orleans-style rhythm & blues of their era". She briefly married Ken Gorman, a singer with Gayten's band, before ending her involvements with both Gorman and Gayten and returning to performing at the Dew Drop Inn.

In 1950 she started recording for Regal Records, issuing several singles, some recorded with the Howard Biggs Orchestra. However, her recordings for Regal were not hits. She also performed in Philadelphia, Baltimore, Chicago and elsewhere on bills with musicians including Paul "Hucklebuck" Williams, Erroll Garner, and Larry Darnell. In 1951, she appeared on a Regal package tour with Paul Gayten and Little Jimmy Scott, some of whose recordings were erroneously attributed to Newsom. She signed for the Chance label in Chicago in 1953 and recorded with the Al Smith orchestra, but the recordings were never released; she also toured with Smith.

Around 1954, Newsom formed a duo known as the Bluzettes (or Bluezettes) with Alberta Adams. Adams said of the duo: "We was the baddest thing out there. We did blues and blues ballads. We was shaped alike, like bricks, with small waistlines. We dressed alike, same hair, and we sounded like one voice". The pair toured with Tiny Bradshaw's band, but had little success, and Newsom withdrew from the music business shortly afterwards. Her last recordings were made in 1957.

Newsom died in Merriam, Kansas, in 2003.
