= Paul Gayten =

American pianist and songwriter (1920–1991)

Background information
- Birth name: Paul Leon Gayten
- Born: January 29, 1920; Kentwood, Louisiana, U.S.
- Died: March 26, 1991 (aged 71); Los Angeles, California, U.S.
- Genres: R&B
- Occupation: Musician
- Instrument: Piano
- Years active: 1940s–1970s

Paul Leon Gayten (January 29, 1920 – March 26, 1991) was an American R&B pianist, songwriter, producer, and record company executive.

== Career ==
Gayten was born in Kentwood, Louisiana, the nephew of blues pianist Little Brother Montgomery. In his teens, he played piano in local bands while also setting up his group, Paul Gayten's Sizzling Six, which featured future bebop saxophonist Teddy Edwards.

During the war, he led a band at the Army base in Biloxi, Mississippi. He then moved to New Orleans and, with a new trio, established a residency at the Club Robin Hood. In 1947 the trio recorded two of the first New Orleans hits of the R&B era, "True (You Don't Love Me)", and "Since I Fell for You", the latter featuring singer Annie Laurie. Both made the top ten in the US Billboard R&B chart. Gayten also backed singer Chubby Newsom on her hit single "Hip Shakin' Mama".

In 1949, Gayten expanded his combo into a nine-piece orchestra and moved to Regal Records. There, Gayten wrote the number 1 R&B hit "For You My Love" for Larry Darnell, and recorded "I'll Never Be Free" again with Annie Laurie. His orchestra toured widely, for a period adding saxophonist Hank Mobley and singer Little Jimmy Scott, and appearing on double bills with both Dizzy Gillespie and Charlie Parker. In 1951, he moved to Okeh Records.

In 1956, he decided to quit as a touring bandleader and joined Chess Records as a talent scout, producer, promotion man, songwriter and part-time musician and recording artist. He discovered Clarence "Frogman" Henry and produced his first hit, "Ain't Got No Home", in 1956, later going on to co-write and produce his biggest hit, "But I Do", in 1961. At Chess, Gayten produced Bobby Charles' "Later Alligator" and played the piano on Chuck Berry's "Carol", "Beautiful Delilah", and "Vacation Time". In 1956, he also had one of the biggest hits of his own career with "The Music Goes Round and Round", followed up by "Nervous Boogie" in 1957, "Windy" in 1958, and "The Hunch" in 1959.

In 1960, he moved to Los Angeles with his wife, Odile, to run the Chess operations there. In 1968, he set up his own label, Pzazz, which recorded Louis Jordan, among others. He continued to live in Los Angeles with Odile after retiring in 1978, and died there aged 71 in March 1991.

== Selected discography (compilations) ==
- Creole Gal with Annie Laurie (Route 66, 1979)
- Chess King of New Orleans (Chess, 1989)
- Regal Records in New Orleans with Annie Laurie (Specialty, 1991)
- Ain't Nothin' Happenin' (Cool Jump Blues 1947–1957) (El Toro, 2010)
- True (You Don't Love Me) – Early Recordings 1947–1949 (Jasmine, 2021)
