= Clarence "Frogman" Henry =

American singer (1937–2024)

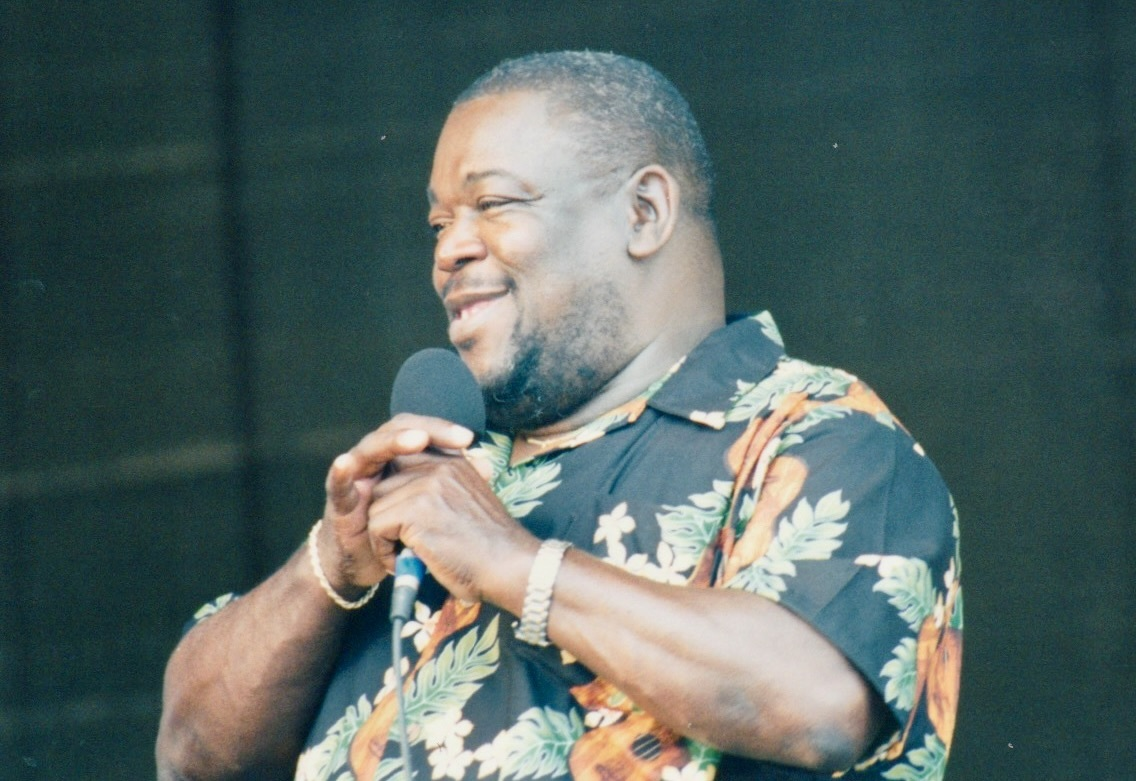
- Henry in 1997

Background information
- Birth name: Clarence Henry II
- Born: March 19, 1937; New Orleans, Louisiana, U.S.
- Died: April 7, 2024 (aged 87); New Orleans, Louisiana, U.S.
- Genres: Rhythm and blues
- Occupation: Musician
- Instrument(s): Vocals, piano
- Years active: 1952–2024
- Labels: Argo

Clarence Henry II (March 19, 1937 – April 7, 2024), known as Clarence "Frogman" Henry, was an American rhythm and blues singer and pianist, best known for his hits "Ain't Got No Home" (1956) and "(I Don't Know Why) But I Do" (1961).

== Life and career ==
Clarence Henry was born in New Orleans on March 19, 1937. In 1947 he moved to the Algiers neighborhood, where he resided for the rest of his life. He started learning piano as a child, with Fats Domino and Professor Longhair his main influences. When Henry played in talent shows, he dressed like Longhair and wore a wig with braids on both sides. He joined Bobby Mitchell & the Toppers in 1952, playing piano and trombone, and left when he graduated in 1955 to join saxophonist Eddie Smith's band.

Henry used his trademark croak to improvise the song "Ain't Got No Home" one night in 1955. Chess Records A&R man Paul Gayten heard the song, and had Henry record it in Cosimo Matassa's studio in September 1956. Initially promoted by local DJ Poppa Stoppa, the song eventually rose to number 3 on the national R&B chart and number 20 on the US pop chart. The gimmick earned Henry his nickname of 'Frogman' and jump-started a career that endured until his death.

Henry toured nationally with a six-piece band until 1958 and continued to record. A cover of Bobby Charles' hit "(I Don't Know Why) But I Do", and "You Always Hurt the One You Love", both from 1961, were his other big hits.

He opened 18 concerts for the Beatles across the US and Canada in 1964, but his main source of income came from New Orleans's Bourbon Street strip, where he played for 19 years.

== Private life and death ==
Henry was married seven times, with all his marriages ending in divorce. He had ten children.

He died in New Orleans on April 7, 2024, at the age of 87, from complications after surgery. Henry continued to perform into his final years and had been scheduled to appear at the 2024 New Orleans Jazz & Heritage Festival later that month.

== Honors ==
Henry's pioneering contribution to the genre has been recognized by the Rockabilly Hall of Fame. In April 2007, Henry was honored for his contributions to Louisiana music with induction into the Louisiana Music Hall of Fame.

== Covers and re-use of Henry's hits ==
The Band recorded a version of Henry's 1956 song "Ain't Got No Home" for their 1973 album Moondog Matinee. It was also used in the cult movie The Lost Boys with actor Corey Haim singing along to it.

On his 1981 Live/Indian Summer album, Al Stewart introduced his song "Year of the Cat" with an odd anecdote about a mistaken-identity encounter involving Henry, Audrey Hepburn, and G. Gordon Liddy wearing an Elvis Presley mask.

Henry's original song was later featured on the soundtrack of the 1982 film Diner. It is also heard in a scene where Shrevie (Daniel Stern) is listening to it on his car radio and singing along.

Rod Stewart used the chorus of "Ain't Got No Home" in his 1984 single "Some Guys Have All the Luck".

"Ain't Got No Home" achieved fresh notoriety in the 1990s through its use as the "Homeless Update" theme music on The Rush Limbaugh Show, and was used as recently as December 7, 2017. Henry credited Limbaugh with boosting his royalties and performed on a Caribbean cruise with him.

The song also appears in the 1995 movie Casino, playing in the background as Joe Pesci asks Robert De Niro for a 50K chip marker. Jimmy Buffett referenced Henry in his song "Saxophones". Henry made a cameo appearance on the third season opening episode of the HBO series Treme.

Henry's 1961 hit, "(I Don't Know Why) But I Do", was covered by Bobby Vinton in 1972 in a pop version. It was also used in a 2019 commercial for Expedia's dog-friendly hotel accommodations.

== Discography ==
=== Albums ===
Year	Album	Record Label
1961	You Always Hurt the One You Love	Argo
1962	Bourbon St. New Orleans	CFH
1970	Clarence (Frogman) Henry is Alive and Well Living in New Orleans and Still Doin' His Thing...	Roulette

=== Singles ===
Year	Single (A-side, B-side)	Chart Positions			
Year	Single (A-side, B-side)	US Pop	US R&B	UK	CAN
1956	"Ain't Got No Home" b/w "Troubles, Troubles"	20	3	-	-
1957	"Lonely Tramp" b/w "I'm A Country Boy"	-	-	-	-
1957	"It Won't Be Long" b/w "I Found A Home"	-	-	-	-
1958	"I'm In Love" b/w "Baby, Baby Please"	-	-	-	-
1961	"(I Don't Know Why) But I Do" b/w "Just My Baby and Me"	4	9	3	2
1961	"You Always Hurt the One You Love" b/w "Little Suzy"	12	11	6	4
1961	"Lonely Street" b/w "Why Can't You"	57	19	42	-
1961	"On Bended Knees" b/w "Standing In The Need Of Love"	64 / 109	-	-	-
1962	"A Little Too Much" b/w "I Wish I Could Say The Same"	77	-	-	-
1962	"Dream Myself A Sweetheart" b/w "Lost Without You"	112	-	-	-
1962	"The Jealous Kind" b/w "Come On and Dance"	-	-	-	-
1963	"It Takes Two To Tango" b/w "If I Didn't Care"	-	-	-	-
1964	"Looking Back" b/w "Long Lost and Worried"	-	-	-	-
1964	"Have You Ever Been Lonely" b/w "Little Green Frog"	135	-	-	-
1965	"You Can't Hide A Tear" b/w "I Told My Pillow"	-	-	-	-
1965	"Tore Up Over You" b/w "I Might As Well"	-	-	-	-
1966	"Ain't Got No Home" (re-recorded version) b/w "Baby Ain't That Love"	-	-	-	-
1966	"Cajun Honey" b/w "Think It Over"	-	-	-	-
1967	"Hummin' A Heartache" b/w "This Time"	-	-	-	-
1968	"That's When I Guessed" b/w "Shake Your Moneymaker"	-	-	-	-
1983	"That Old Piano" b/w "Keep Your Hands Off Her"	-	-	-	-
1993	"(I Don't Know Why) But I Do" b/w "Ain't Got No Home"; A-side chart reentry	-	-	65	-
