= Forrest Gump – Original Motion Picture Score =

Film score by Alan Silvestri
- Released: June 28, 1994 (U.S.)
- Recorded: 1993–1994
- Genre: Orchestral
- Length: 39:24
- Label: Epic Soundtrax

Professional ratings
Review scores
Source	Rating
AllMusic	3/5 stars

Forrest Gump – Original Motion Picture Score is the original score album for the 1994 film Forrest Gump, directed by Robert Zemeckis. The music was composed and conducted by Alan Silvestri and performed by the Hollywood Studio Symphony.

Silvestri's music was nominated for Best Original Score in the 67th Academy Awards. The album released is not to be confused with the better-selling (and therefore more common) album of diegetic songs from the film, which were released as Forrest Gump: The Soundtrack.

== Critical response ==
AllMusic's William Ruhlmann called it "saccharine", and said that while it worked as a soundtrack "it has little value on its own", but still awarded it three stars out of possible five.

== Track listing ==
1. "I'm Forrest... Forrest Gump" – 2:41
2. "You're No Different" – 1:00
3. "You Can't Sit Here" – 2:27
4. "Run Forrest Run" – 2:14
5. "Pray with Me" – 0:58
6. "The Crimson Gump" – 1:08
7. "They're Sending Me to Vietnam" – 2:24
8. "I Ran and Ran" – 1:44
9. "I Had a Destiny" – 1:19
10. "Washington Reunion" – 0:46
11. "Jesus on the Main Line" (arranger: Silvestri, soloist: Donny Gerard) – 2:00
12. "That's My Boat" – 1:16
13. "I Never Thanked You" – 0:48
14. "Jenny Returns" – 2:43
15. "The Crusade" – 2:01
16. "Forrest Meets Forrest" – 1:42
17. "The Wedding Guest" – 1:48
18. "Where Heaven Ends" – 1:34
19. "Jenny's Grave" – 1:27
20. "I'll Be Right Here" – 0:49
21. "Suite from Forrest Gump" – 6:34

The "Forrest Gump Suite" on the song soundtrack is a combination of "I'm Forrest...Forrest Gump" and "Suite from Forrest Gump" (the main and end titles respectively).
