= Dew Drop Inn (New Orleans) =

Former hotel and nightclub in New Orleans, Louisiana

Coordinates: 29°56′12.9″N 90°5′29.9″W

- U.S. National Register of Historic Places
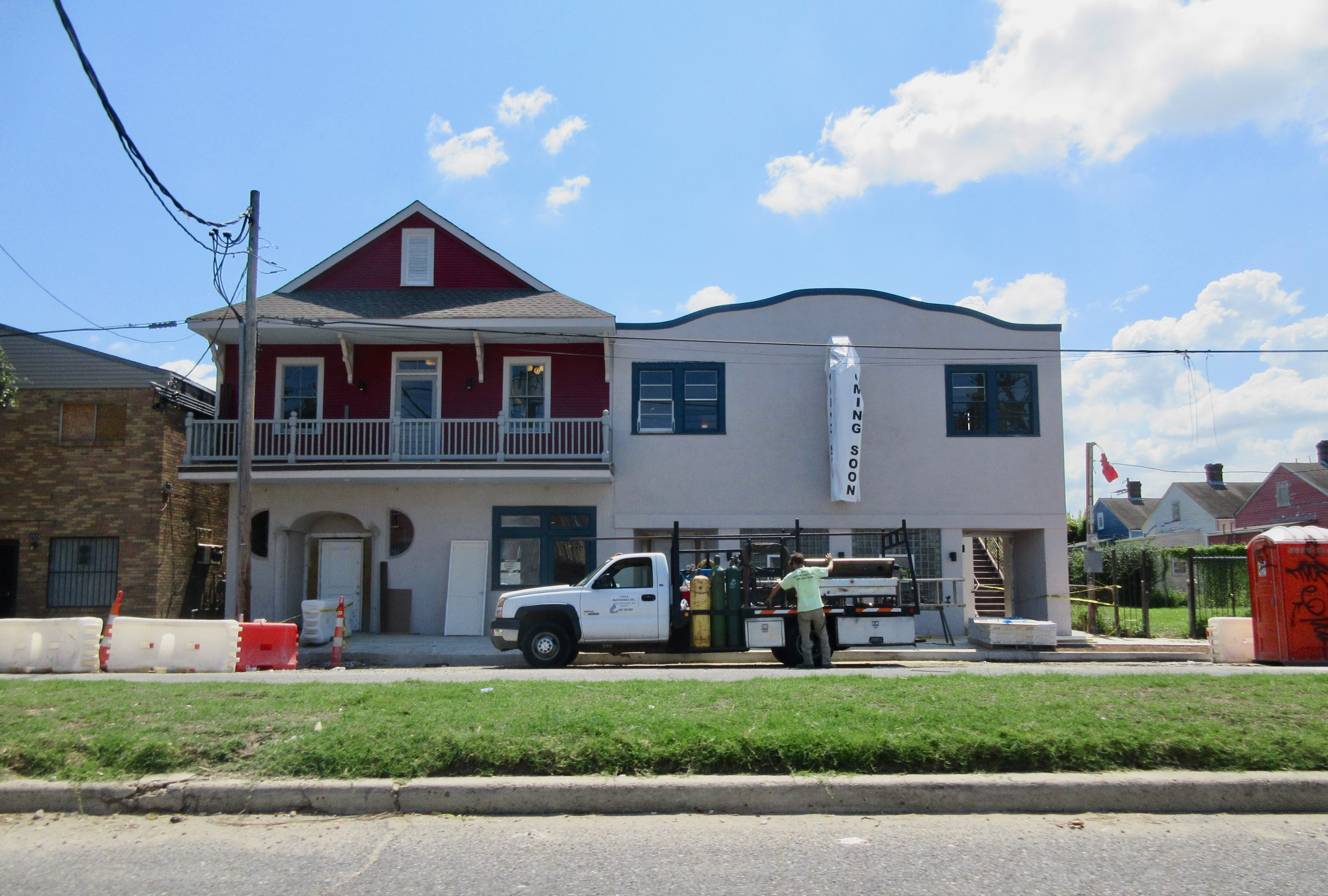
- Dew Drop Inn in September 2023
- Location: 2836 LaSalle Street; New Orleans, Louisiana
- Website: www.dewdropinnnola.com
- NRHP reference No.: 100007552

The Dew Drop Inn, at 2836 LaSalle Street, in the Faubourg Delassize section of Central City neighborhood of New Orleans, Louisiana, is a former hotel and nightclub that operated between 1939 and 1970, and is noted as "the most important and influential club" in the development of rhythm and blues music in the city in the post-war period. The venue primarily served the African-American population in the then heavily segregated Southern United States.

== History ==
Frank G. Painia (1907–1972) established a barbershop on LaSalle Street in the late 1930s. He began selling refreshments to workers at the nearby Magnolia Housing Project, and then expanded his premises to include a bar and hotel, which opened as the Dew Drop Inn in April 1939. During World War II, Painia also started booking bands for concerts in the city, and frequently had the musicians staying at his hotel. He started putting on entertainment in the hotel lounge, before developing it further into a dancehall, which opened in 1945.

Nicknamed "the Groove Room", the Dew Drop Inn was reported in October 1945 by the Louisiana Weekly to be "New Orleans' swankiest nightclub", and began featuring visiting musicians such as Joe Turner, the Sweethearts of Rhythm, Amos Milburn, Lollypop Jones, Clarence "Gatemouth" Brown, Ivory Joe Hunter, Chubby Newsom, The Ravens, Dinah Washington, Big Maybelle, and Cecil Gant. The resident bandleaders were local musicians Dave Bartholomew and Edgar Blanchard, and Painia discovered and helped establish local stars including Larry Darnell, Tommy Ridgley, Earl King, Huey "Piano" Smith, and Allen Toussaint.

In November 1952, Frank Painia, together with Hollywood film actor Zachary Scott and his friends, were arrested and charged with disturbing the peace, following a complaint to the New Orleans Police Department that "Negroes and whites were being served together," which was technically illegal at the time. The charges were later dismissed, and Painia continued to challenge the constitutionality of the law, filing suit against the city just before the Civil Rights Act of 1964 forced its repeal. The club continued to attract star performers in the 1950s and 1960s, including Ray Charles, James Brown, Sam Cooke, Ike & Tina Turner, Otis Redding, Solomon Burke, and Little Richard, who wrote a song, "Dew Drop Inn", about the venue. The club's MCs included blues singer Joseph "Mr. Google Eyes" August, and drag queen Patsy Valdalia (born Irving Ale, 1921–1982), who organised and hosted the annual New Orleans Gay Ball, held at the club every Halloween.

The club's popularity declined from the mid-1960s, after the repeal of segregation laws allowed other clubs to open, and Painia suffered from ill health. Though the hotel continued to function, the floor shows became irregular and eventually ceased. Frank Painia died from cancer in July 1972, and the restaurant and bar were leased to new occupants. The building fell into increasing disrepair, but remained in the ownership of the Painia family. It was flooded and further damaged as a result of Hurricane Katrina in 2005.

== Current position ==
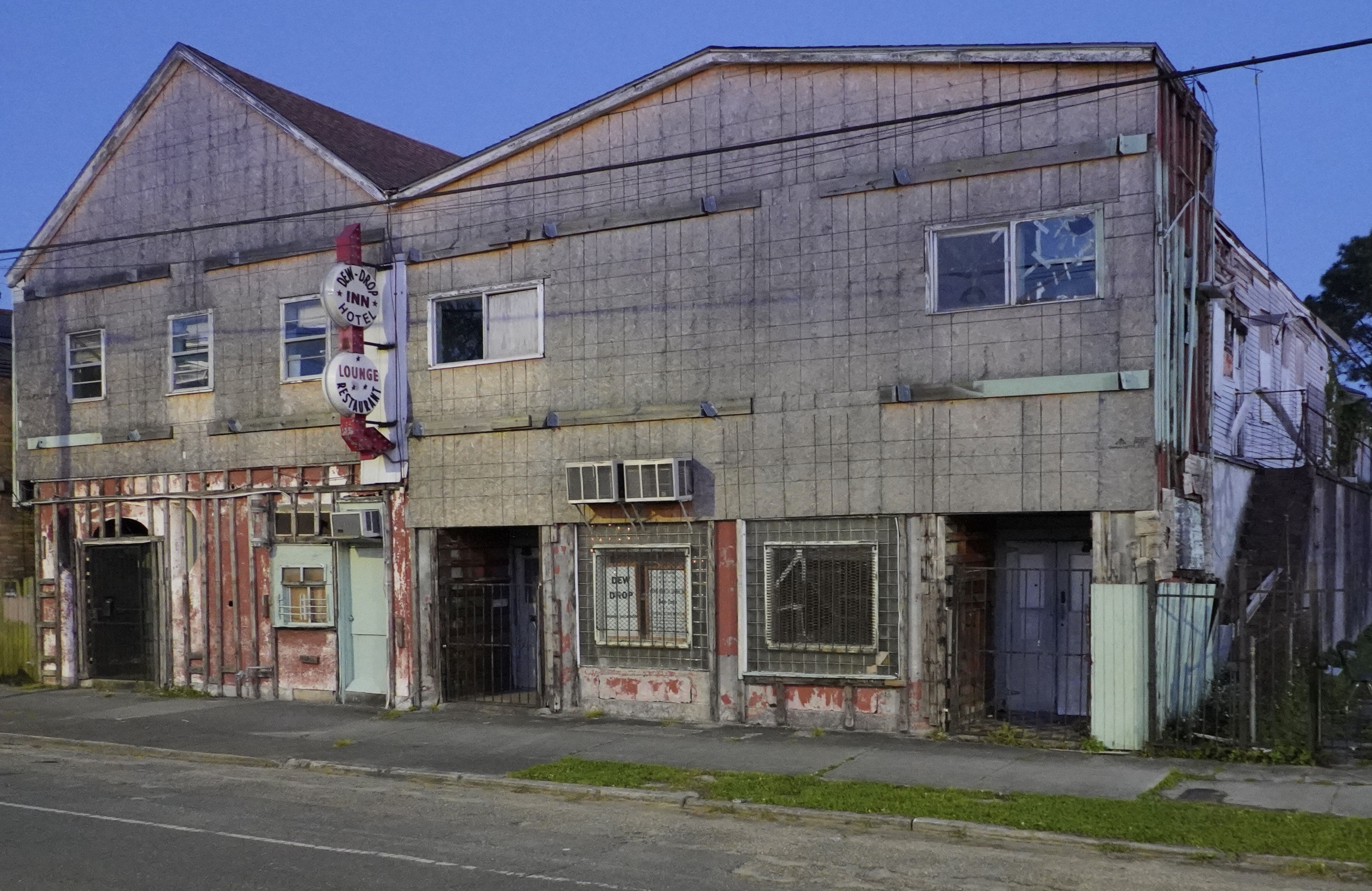
Dew Drop Inn in April 2022

In 2010, the building was named by the Louisiana Landmark Society as one of the city's most important endangered buildings, and "an iconic example of the importance of music venues to New Orleans culture". Later in 2010 the site was designated a historic landmark by the New Orleans Historic District Landmarks Commission. A campaign to raise $3.5 million to restore the Dew Drop Inn as a nightclub-hotel-restaurant and training center was started by Painia's grandson Kenneth Jackson in 2015 with support from Harmony Neighborhood Development and the Tulane School of Architecture. After failing to gain financial support for development the property was listed for sale in 2018.

In 2021, it was reported that real estate developer Curtis Doucette Jr., with the support of Kenneth Jackson, had secured funding for a $7.8 million project to restore and develop the Dew Drop Inn. The building was listed on the National Register of Historic Places in 2022. The building was under restoration efforts by Ryan Gootee General Contractors for years. The Dew Drop Inn reopened on March 1, 2024, with a weekend-long event.
