= List of songs recorded by Fats Domino =

This is a list of recordings by American rhythm and blues and rock 'n' roll performer and songwriter Fats Domino.

== Studio recordings ==
Over 350 studio recordings by Fats Domino have been released in total. Some of them were the same recordings, but released under different titles, while some other recordings had the same title, but were in fact completely different songs. Certain songs have been recorded at different sessions, often in significantly different style, and are identified as different versions.

=== Recording sessions ===
Fats Domino: vocals and piano, unless instrumentals (piano only), marked by (instr.) after title and otherwise stated.

==== Imperial ====
Fats Domino was signed to the Imperial Records label in 1949 and left it in early 1963, when the label was sold to Liberty Records. However, dozens of his recordings for Imperial have been overdubbed with female vocal chorus from May to July 1963 and next released by Liberty. Complete Imperial recordings have been released in 1993 on 8-CD box Out of New Orleans.

Personnel	Recorded titles
**J & M Studio, 838 North Rampart Street, New Orleans, Louisiana**
10 December 1949 (Note: This session was recorded on acetate disc.)
Ernest McLean: guitar Frank Fields: bass Earl Palmer: drums Dave Bartholomew: trumpet Joe Harris: alto saxophone Herbert "Herb" Hardesty, Clarence Hall: tenor saxophone Alvin "Red" Tyler: baritone saxophone	"Detroit City Blues" "The Fat Man" "Hide Away Blues" "She's My Baby"
7 January 1950
Ernest McLean: guitar Frank Fields: bass Earl Palmer: drums Dave Bartholomew: trumpet Joe Harris: alto saxophone Herbert "Herb" Hardesty, Clarence Hall: tenor saxophone Alvin "Red" Tyler: baritone saxophone	"Brand New Baby" "Little Bee" "Boogie Woogie Baby" "Hey! La Bas Boogie"
Early September 1950
Ernest McLean: guitar Frank Fields: bass Earl Palmer: drums Dave Bartholomew: trumpet, flugelhorn Joe Harris: alto saxophone Herbert "Herb" Hardesty, Clarence Hall: tenor saxophone Alvin "Red" Tyler: baritone saxophone	"Korea Blues" "Every Night About This Time" "Careless Love" "Hey! Fat Man"
January 1951
Walter "Papoose" Nelson: guitar William "Billy" Diamond: bass Earl Palmer: drums Wendell Duconge (Emmett Fortner): alto saxophone Robert "Buddy" Hagans: tenor saxophone	"Tired of Crying" "What's the Matter Baby" "I've Got Eyes for You" "Stay Away"
February 1951
Walter "Papoose" Nelson: guitar William "Billy" Diamond: bass Earl Palmer: drums Wendell Duconge (Emmett Fortner): alto saxophone Robert "Buddy" Hagans: tenor saxophone	"Don't You Lie to Me" "My Baby's Gone" "Rockin' Chair" "Sometimes I Wonder"
June 1951
Walter "Papoose" Nelson: guitar William "Billy" Diamond: bass Earl Palmer: drums Wendell Duconge (Emmett Fortner): alto saxophone Robert "Buddy" Hagans: tenor saxophone	"Right From Wrong" "You Know I Miss You" "I'll Be Gone" "No, No Baby"
November 1951 or January 1952
Harrison Verrett: guitar William "Billy" Diamond: bass Earl Palmer: drums Wendell Duconge (Emmett Fortner): alto saxophone Robert "Buddy" Hagans: tenor saxophone	"Reeling and Rocking" "Goin' Home" "The Fat Man's Hop" (instr.) "How Long"
26 April 1952
Walter "Papoose" Nelson: guitar William "Billy" Diamond: bass Earl Palmer: drums Dave Bartholomew: trumpet Wendell Duconge (Emmett Fortner): alto saxophone Robert "Buddy" Hagans, Herbert "Herb" Hardesty: tenor saxophone	"Long Lonesome Journey" "Poor Poor Me" "Trust in Me" "Cheatin'"
10 September 1952
Walter "Papoose" Nelson: guitar Frank Fields: bass Earl Palmer: drums Wendell Duconge (Emmett Fortner): alto saxophone Herbert "Herb" Hardesty: tenor saxophone	"Mardi Gras in New Orleans" "I Guess I'll Be on My Way" "Nobody Loves Me" "Dreaming" (instr.)
December 1952 or January 1953
Walter "Papoose" Nelson: guitar Frank Fields: bass Earl Palmer: drums Possibly Wendell Duconge (Emmett Fortner): alto saxophone Herbert "Herb" Hardesty, Samuel Lee: tenor saxophone	"Going to the River" "I Love Her" "Second Line Jump" (instr.)
February 1953
Walter "Papoose" Nelson: guitar Frank Fields: bass Earl Palmer: drums Possibly Wendell Duconge (Emmett Fortner): alto saxophone Herbert "Herb" Hardesty: tenor saxophone	"Goodbye" "Swanee River Hop" (instr.)
**Radio Recorders, 7000 Santa Monica Boulevard, Hollywood, California**
18 April 1953
Walter "Papoose" Nelson: guitar William "Billy" Diamond: bass Earl Palmer: drums Wendell Duconge (Emmett Fortner): alto saxophone Robert "Buddy" Hagans: tenor saxophone	"Rose Mary" "Please Don't Leave Me" "Domino Stomp" (instr.)
**J & M Studio, 838 North Rampart Street, New Orleans, Louisiana**
1 June 1953
Walter "Papoose" Nelson: guitar Frank Fields: bass Earl Palmer: drums Wendell Duconge (Emmett Fortner): alto saxophone Robert "Buddy" Hagans; Herbert "Herb" Hardesty or Lee Allen: tenor saxophone	"Rose Mary" "Fats Domino Blues" (instr.) "Ain't It Good" "The Girl I Love"
2 September 1953
Walter "Papoose" Nelson: guitar Frank Fields: bass Earl Palmer: drums Wendell Duconge (Emmett Fortner): alto saxophone Robert "Buddy" Hagans; Herbert "Herb" Hardesty or Lee Allen: tenor saxophone	"Don't Leave Me This Way" "Something's Wrong" "My Heart Is in Your Hands" "Fats' Frenzy" (instr.)
19 September 1953
Walter "Papoose" Nelson: guitar William "Billy" Diamond: bass Cornelius "Tenoo" Coleman: drums Wendell Duconge (Emmett Fortner): alto saxophone Robert "Buddy" Hagans: tenor saxophone	"Goin' Back Home" "You Left Me" "44"
27 October 1953
Walter "Papoose" Nelson: guitar Frank Fields: bass Earl Palmer: drums Wendell Duconge (Emmett Fortner): alto saxophone Herbert "Herb" Hardesty or Lee Allen: tenor saxophone	"Barrel House" (instr.) "Little School Girl" "If You Need Me"
14 December 1953
Walter "Papoose" Nelson: guitar Frank Fields: bass Earl Palmer: drums Dave Bartholomew: trumpet Herbert "Herb" Hardesty, Lee Allen: tenor saxophone	"You Done Me Wrong" "Thinking of You"
14 March 1954
Walter "Papoose" Nelson: guitar Frank Fields: bass Earl Palmer: drums Dave Bartholomew: trumpet Herbert "Herb" Hardesty, Lee Allen: tenor saxophone	"Baby Please" "Where Did You Stay" "You Can Pack Your Suitcase"
**Master Recorders, 535 North Fairfax Avenue, Hollywood, California**
10 July 1954
Walter "Papoose" Nelson: guitar William "Billy" Diamond: bass Cornelius "Tenoo" Coleman: drums Wendell Duconge (Emmett Fortner): alto saxophone Robert "Buddy" Hagans: tenor saxophone	"I Lived My Life" "Little Mama" "I Know"
**J & M Studio, 838 North Rampart Street, New Orleans, Louisiana**
13 August 1954
Walter "Papoose" Nelson: guitar Frank Fields: bass Earl Palmer: drums Possibly Dave Bartholomew: trumpet Herbert "Herb" Hardesty, Lee Allen: tenor saxophone Unknown: baritone saxophone	"Love Me" "Don't You Hear Me Calling You"
27 January 1955
Walter "Papoose" Nelson: guitar Frank Fields: bass Earl Palmer: drums Possibly Dave Bartholomew: trumpet Herbert "Herb" Hardesty, Robert "Buddy" Hagans: tenor saxophone	"Don't You Know" "Helping Hand"
**Master Recorders, 535 North Fairfax Avenue, Hollywood, California**
15 March 1955
Walter "Papoose" Nelson: guitar William "Billy" Diamond: bass Cornelius "Tenoo" Coleman: drums Samuel Lee: saxophone Herbert "Herb" Hardesty, Robert "Buddy" Hagans: tenor saxophone	"Help Me" "All by Myself" "Ain't It a Shame" "Oh Ba-a-by"
30 March 1955
Walter "Papoose" Nelson: guitar William "Billy" Diamond: bass Cornelius "Tenoo" Coleman: drums Robert "Buddy" Hagans: tenor saxophone Herbert "Herb" Hardesty: tenor and baritone saxophone	"La-La" "Blue Monday"
**J & M Studio, 838 North Rampart Street, New Orleans, Louisiana**
May 1955
Walter "Papoose" Nelson: guitar Frank Fields: bass Earl Palmer: drums Herbert "Herb" Hardesty: tenor saxophone	"Troubles of My Own"
23 September 1955
Ernest McLean: guitar Frank Fields: bass Earl Palmer: drums Clarence Ford: alto saxophone Herbert "Herb" Hardesty: tenor saxophone	"What's Wrong" "Poor Me"
15 October 1955
Ernest McLean: guitar Frank Fields: bass Earl Palmer: drums Clarence Ford: alto saxophone Herbert "Herb" Hardesty, Lee Allen: tenor saxophone	"I Can't Go On" "I'm in Love Again" "Bo Weevil"
**Master Recorders, 535 North Fairfax Avenue, Hollywood, California**
7 November 1955
Walter "Papoose" Nelson: guitar William "Billy" Diamond: bass Cornelius "Tenoo" Coleman: drums Wendell Duconge (Emmett Fortner): alto saxophone Robert "Buddy" Hagans: tenor saxophone	"Help Me" "Don't Blame It on Me" "If You Need Me"
30 November 1955
Walter "Papoose" Nelson: guitar William "Billy" Diamond: bass Cornelius "Tenoo" Coleman: drums Wendell Duconge (Emmett Fortner): alto saxophone Robert "Buddy" Hagans: tenor saxophone	"Howdy Podner" "So Long"
**J & M Studio, 838 North Rampart Street, New Orleans, Louisiana**
23 December 1955
Ernest McLean: guitar Frank Fields: bass Earl Palmer: drums Possibly Clarence Ford: alto saxophone Robert "Buddy" Hagans, Lee Allen, Herbert "Herb" Hardesty: tenor saxophone	"I Can't Go On This Way" "My Blue Heaven"
Possibly **Cosimo Recording Studio, 523 Governor Nicholls Street, New Orleans, Louisiana**
25 May 1956
Justin Adams, Ernest McLean: guitar Frank Fields: bass Charles "Hungry" Williams: drums Dave Bartholomew: trumpet Lee Allen, Herbert "Herb" Hardesty: tenor saxophone	"Don't Know What's Wrong" "Ida Jane" "When My Dreamboat Comes Home"
**Master Recorders, 535 North Fairfax Avenue, Hollywood, California**
21 June 1956
Walter "Papoose" Nelson: guitar Lawrence Guyton: bass Cornelius "Tenoo" Coleman: drums Herbert "Herb" Hardesty, Eddie Sylvas: tenor saxophone	"What's the Reason I'm Not Pleasing You" "Don't Know What's Wrong"
27 June 1956
Walter "Papoose" Nelson: guitar Lawrence Guyton: bass Cornelius "Tenoo" Coleman: drums Wendell Duconge (Emmett Fortner): alto saxophone Robert "Buddy" Hagans, Eddie Sylvas: tenor saxophone	"Blueberry Hill" "Honey Chile"
**Cosimo Recording Studio, 523 Governor Nicholls Street, New Orleans, Louisiana**
3 January 1957
Walter "Papoose" Nelson: guitar Frank Fields: bass Earl Palmer: drums Lee Allen, Herbert "Herb" Hardesty: tenor saxophone	"I'm Walkin'" "What Will I Tell My Heart"
4 January 1957
Walter "Papoose" Nelson: guitar Frank Fields: bass Earl Palmer: drums Lee Allen, Herbert "Herb" Hardesty: tenor saxophone	"I'm in the Mood for Love" "Would You" "My Happiness"
25 January 1957
Walter "Papoose" Nelson: guitar Frank Fields: bass Earl Palmer: drums Clarence Ford: baritone saxophone Herbert "Herb" Hardesty, possibly Lee Allen: tenor saxophone	"Don't Deceive Me" "The Rooster Song" "Telling Lies"
20 February 1957
Ernest McLean: guitar Frank Fields: bass Cornelius "Tenoo" Coleman: drums Possibly Dave Bartholomew: trumpet Waldren "Frog" Joseph: trombone Lee Allen, Herbert "Herb" Hardesty: tenor saxophone	"As Time Goes By" (instr.) "Town Talk" (instr.) "Twistin' the Spots" (instr.)
7 March 1957
Jimmie Haskell: leader Ramez Idriss, Howard Roberts: guitar Andrew Lambert: bass Earl Palmer: drums Robert E. Armstrong, Plas Johnson: tenor saxophone	"It's You I Love" "Valley of Tears" "Wait and See" "True Confession"
1 June 1957
Fats Domino: piano Ernest McLean: guitar Frank Fields: bass Cornelius "Tenoo" Coleman: drums Herbert "Herb" Hardesty: tenor saxophone Clarence Ford: baritone saxophone	"Sailor Boy" (Note: Overdubbed by Fats Domino vocals at Cosimo Recording Studio in 2 May 1958.) "It Must Be Love"
5 June 1957
Ernest McLean: guitar Frank Fields: bass Cornelius "Tenoo" Coleman: drums Lee Allen, Herbert "Herb" Hardesty: tenor saxophone Clarence Ford: baritone saxophone	"The Big Beat"
13 June 1957
Ernest McLean: guitar Frank Fields: bass Possibly Earl Palmer: drums Herbert "Herb" Hardesty: tenor saxophone Clarence Ford: baritone saxophone Possibly Ann Cole in "When I See You": vocals Possibly Paul Gayten in "When I See You": piano	"Little Mary" "Stack & Billy" "When I See You"
3 August 1957
Ernest McLean: guitar Frank Fields: bass Possibly Earl Palmer: drums Herbert "Herb" Hardesty: tenor saxophone Clarence Ford: baritone saxophone Unknown in "Oh Wee": bass saxophone	"Oh Wee" "I Still Love You" "My Love for Her"
6 October 1957
Possibly Allen Toussaint: piano Walter "Papoose" Nelson: guitar Frank Fields: bass Cornelius "Tenoo" Coleman: drums Herbert "Herb" Hardesty, Lee Allen: tenor saxophone	"I Want You to Know" (Note: Later overdubbed by Fats Domino vocals at Cosimo Recording Studio.)
28 January 1958
Allen Toussaint or Edward Frank: piano Walter "Papoose" Nelson: guitar Frank Fields: bass Cornelius "Tenoo" Coleman: drums Herbert "Herb" Hardesty, Lee Allen: tenor saxophone	"Yes, My Darling" "Don't You Know I Love You"
**Master Recorders, 535 North Fairfax Avenue, Hollywood, California**
4 February 1958
Willie Jones: guitar James "Jimmie" Davis: bass Cornelius "Tenoo" Coleman: drums Wendell Duconge (Emmett Fortner): alto saxophone Herbert "Herb" Hardesty, Robert "Buddy" Hagans: tenor saxophone Clarence Ford: baritone saxophone	"Sick and Tired" "No, No"
**Cosimo Recording Studio, 523 Governor Nicholls Street, New Orleans, Louisiana**
17 April 1958
Ernest McLean: guitar Frank Fields: bass Cornelius "Tenoo" Coleman: drums Wendell Duconge (Emmett Fortner): alto and baritone saxophone Herbert "Herb" Hardesty, Clarence Ford: tenor saxophone Unknown in "One of These Days": vocal chorus	"Prisoner's Song" "One of These Days" "I'll Be Glad When You're Dead You Rascal You"
14 June 1958
Possibly Allen Toussaint: piano Ernest McLean: guitar Frank Fields: bass Cornelius "Tenoo" Coleman: drums Wendell Duconge (Emmett Fortner): alto saxophone Herbert "Herb" Hardesty, Clarence Ford, Robert "Buddy" Hagans: tenor saxophone Band members in "I'm Gonna Be a Wheel Someday": vocal chorus	"Young School Girl" "I'm Gonna Be a Wheel Someday" (Note: This instrumental backing track is included in box-set I've Been Around (CD 9/23).) "How Can I Be Happy"
25 July 1958
Allen Toussaint: piano Unknown: guitar, bass, drums	"Lazy Woman"
15 August 1958
Ernest McLean: guitar Frank Fields: bass Cornelius "Tenoo" Coleman: drums, percussion Possibly Dave Bartholomew: trumpet Warren Bell: tenor saxophone Clarence Ford: alto and tenor saxophone Possibly The Velvetones (Note: The Velvetones are said to have been a three-member female New Orleans group.) in "Isle of Capri", "Coquette": vocal chorus	"Isle of Capri" "Coquette" "Once in a While" "The Sheik of Araby"
23 September 1958
Ernest McLean, Walter "Papoose" Nelson: guitar Frank Fields: bass Charles "Hungry" Williams: drums Dave Bartholomew: trumpet Herbert "Herb" Hardesty, Clarence Ford: tenor saxophone	"Whole Lotta Loving" "I Miss You So" "Margie" "I'll Always Be in Love With You"
**Master Recorders, 535 North Fairfax Avenue, Hollywood, California**
30 October 1958 (Note: Stereo recordings start with this session.)
Walter "Papoose" Nelson: guitar George "Red" Callender: bass Earl Palmer: drums Herbert "Herb" Hardesty: tenor saxophone Plas Johnson: tenor and baritone saxophone	"If You Need Me" "Hands Across the Table" "So Glad" "Darktown Strutter's Ball" "Margie" "The Sheik of Araby"
4 November 1958
Walter "Papoose" Nelson: guitar Adolphus Alsbrook, Jr.: bass Earl Palmer: drums Herbert "Herb" Hardesty: tenor saxophone Plas Johnson: baritone saxophone	"My Bleeding Heart" "I Hear You Knocking" "Lil' Liza Jane" "Every Night About This Time" "When the Saints Go Marching In" "Country Boy"
**Cosimo Recording Studio, 523 Governor Nicholls Street, New Orleans, Louisiana**
29 January 1959
Walter "Papoose" Nelson: guitar Unknown: bass Cornelius "Tenoo" Coleman: drums Robert "Buddy" Hagans, Herbert "Herb" Hardesty: tenor saxophone Clarence Ford: baritone saxophone	"I'm Ready"
18 June 1959
Walter "Papoose" Nelson: guitar Unknown: bass Cornelius "Tenoo" Coleman: drums Robert "Buddy" Hagans, Herbert "Herb" Hardesty: tenor saxophone Clarence Ford: tenor and baritone saxophone	"I Want to Walk You Home" "When I Was Young" "Easter Parade"
26 September 1959
Roy Montrell: guitar Unknown: bass Cornelius "Tenoo" Coleman: drums Dave Bartholomew: trumpet Robert "Buddy" Hagans: tenor saxophone Clarence Ford: baritone saxophone	"I've Been Around" "Be My Guest"
10 February 1960
Roy Montrell: guitar Unknown: bass Cornelius "Tenoo" Coleman: drums Possibly Robert "Buddy" Hagans: tenor saxophone Clarence Ford: baritone saxophone	"Tell Me That You Love Me" "Before I Grow Too Old"
23 or 30 April 1960
Possibly Roy Montrell: guitar Unknown: bass Possibly Cornelius "Tenoo" Coleman: drums Possibly Robert "Buddy" Hagans: tenor saxophone Possibly Clarence Ford: baritone saxophone	"Walking to New Orleans" (Note: Later overdubbed with strings by members of The New Orleans Symphony Orchestra at Cosimo Recording Studio.) "Don't Come Knockin'" "La-La"
July 1960
Possibly Roy Montrell: guitar Unknown: bass Cornelius "Tenoo" Coleman: drums Dave Bartholomew: trumpet Lee Allen, Robert "Buddy" Hagans: tenor saxophone Clarence Ford: baritone saxophone	"Put Your Arms Around Me Honey" "Three Nights a Week" "Shurah" "Rising Sun"
18 July 1960
Possibly Roy Montrell: guitar Unknown: bass Possibly Cornelius "Tenoo" Coleman: drums Possibly Lee Allen, Herbert "Herb" Hardesty, Robert "Buddy" Hagans: tenor saxophone Possibly Clarence Ford: baritone saxophone	"My Girl Josephine" (Note: Dave Bartholomew asserts that this is vocal/piano overdub by Domino on a pre-recorded track.)
6 August 1960
Possibly Roy Montrell: guitar Unknown: bass Possibly Cornelius "Tenoo" Coleman: drums Possibly Lee Allen, Herbert "Herb" Hardesty, Robert "Buddy" Hagans: tenor saxophone Possibly Clarence Ford: baritone saxophone	"You Always Hurt the One You Love" "Magic Isles" "Natural Born Lover" "Am I Blue" "It's the Talk of the Town"
28 December 1960
Roy Montrell: guitar Unknown: bass Cornelius "Tenoo" Coleman: drums Dave Bartholomew: trumpet Lee Allen, possibly Robert "Buddy" Hagans: tenor saxophone Possibly Clarence Ford: baritone saxophone	"It Keeps Rainin'" "What a Price" "Ain't That Just Like a Woman" "Fell in Love on Monday"
23 March 1961
Roy Montrell: guitar Unknown: bass Cornelius "Tenoo" Coleman: drums Dave Bartholomew: trumpet Lee Allen, Robert "Buddy" Hagans: tenor saxophone Clarence Ford: baritone saxophone	"Trouble in Mind" "Hold Hands" "Bad Luck and Trouble" "I've Been Calling"
28 March 1961
Roy Montrell: guitar Unknown: bass Cornelius "Tenoo" Coleman: drums Dave Bartholomew: trumpet Lee Allen, Robert "Buddy" Hagans: tenor saxophone Clarence Ford: baritone saxophone	"I Just Cry" "Ain't Gonna Do It" "If I Could" "One Night"
6 June 1961
Roy Montrell: guitar Unknown: bass Cornelius "Tenoo" Coleman: drums Dave Bartholomew: trumpet Lee Allen: tenor saxophone Robert "Buddy" Hagans: tenor and baritone saxophone	"Won't You Come on Back" "I Can't Give You Anything but Love" "I'm Alone Because I Love You" "Good Hearted Man"
20 June 1961, session 1
Roy Montrell: guitar Unknown: bass Cornelius "Tenoo" Coleman: drums Dave Bartholomew: trumpet Lee Allen, Robert "Buddy" Hagans, Herbert "Herb" Hardesty: tenor saxophone	"In a Shanty in Old Shanty Town" "Along the Navajo Trail" "One Night" "Let the Four Winds Blow"
20 June 1961, session 2
Roy Montrell: guitar Unknown: bass Cornelius "Tenoo" Coleman: drums Dave Bartholomew: trumpet Lee Allen, Robert "Buddy" Hagans, Herbert "Herb" Hardesty: tenor saxophone Clarence Ford: baritone saxophone	"Trouble Blues" "You Win Again" "Your Cheating Heart" "Let the Four Winds Blow"
11 September 1961
Roy Montrell: guitar Unknown: bass Cornelius "Tenoo" Coleman: drums Dave Bartholomew: trumpet Lee Allen, Robert "Buddy" Hagans: tenor saxophone Clarence Ford: baritone saxophone Jimmy Donley and Murphy Monroe Pee Wee Maddux in "What a Party": vocal chorus Unknown in "What a Party", "Rockin' Bicycle": vocal chorus	"What a Party" "Rockin' Bicycle" "Did You Ever See a Dream Walking"
October 1961
Possibly Fats Domino: vocals, piano Possibly Roy Montrell: guitar Unknown: bass Possibly Cornelius "Tenoo" Coleman: drums Possibly Dave Bartholomew: trumpet Possibly Lee Allen, Robert "Buddy" Hagans: tenor saxophone Possibly Clarence Ford: baritone saxophone	"True Confession" "I Remember When" "Whispering Wind" "Just Me and You"
**Camden, New Jersey**
2 November 1961
Roy Montrell: guitar Possibly James "Jimmie" Davis: bass Cornelius "Tenoo" Coleman: drums Dave Bartholomew: trumpet Lee Allen, Robert "Buddy" Hagans: tenor saxophone Clarence Ford: baritone saxophone	"Birds and Bees" (Note: Imperial files show "Birds and Bees" to be an overdub on "I Remember When" from previous session.)
**Cosimo Recording Studio, 523 Governor Nicholls Street, New Orleans, Louisiana**
6 November 1961
Roy Montrell: guitar Unknown: bass Cornelius "Tenoo" Coleman: drums Dave Bartholomew: trumpet Lee Allen, Robert "Buddy" Hagans: tenor saxophone Clarence Ford: baritone saxophone	"Wishing Ring" "Jambalaya (On the Bayou)" "Do You Know What It Means to Miss New Orleans" "South of the Border"
5 January 1962
Roy Montrell: guitar Unknown: bass Cornelius "Tenoo" Coleman: drums, percussion Dave Bartholomew: trumpet Herbert "Herb" Hardesty: tenor saxophone Clarence Ford: baritone saxophone	"Teen Age Love" "Stop the Clock" "Goin' Home" "My Real Name"
14 April 1962
Roy Montrell: guitar Unknown: bass Cornelius "Tenoo" Coleman: drums Dave Bartholomew: trumpet Lee Allen, Herbert "Herb" Hardesty, Robert "Buddy" Hagans: tenor saxophone Clarence Ford: baritone saxophone	"Hum Diddy Doo" "Those Eyes" "I Want to Go Home" "Dance With Mr. Domino" "Nothing New (Same Old Thing"

==== ABC-Paramount ====
Fats Domino recorded at ABC-Paramount from April 1963 to February 1965. Complete ABC-Paramount recordings have been released in 1996 on 3-CD box The Fat Man.

Personnel	Recorded titles
**Phillips Studio, 319 7th Avenue North, Nashville, Tennessee**
21 April 1963
Bill Justis: leader, arranger Roy Montrell: guitar, contractor Jerry Glenn Kennedy, Wayne Moss: guitar Henry P. Strzelecki: Fender bass William Paul Ackerman: percussion Murray M. "Buddy" Harman, Jr.: drums Harold R. "Ray Stevens" Ragsdale: organ? Homer Louis "Boots" Randolph: saxophone Glenn Edward Baxter: trumpet Brenton Bolden Banks, Cecil L. Brower, Sollie Isaac Fott, Lillian Vann Hunt: violin Felton Jarvis: producer	"I've Got a Right to Cry" "There Goes My Heart Again" "Can't Go on Without You" "Nobody Needs You Like Me"
23 April 1963
Bill Justis: leader, arranger Roy Montrell: guitar, contractor Jerry Glenn Kennedy, Wayne Moss: guitar Henry P. Strzelecki: Fender bass William Paul Ackerman: percussion Murray M. "Buddy" Harman, Jr.: drums Harold R. "Ray Stevens" Ragsdale: organ? Homer Louis "Boots" Randolph: saxophone Glenn Edward Baxter, Cameron "LaVelle" Muillins: trumpet Brenton Bolden Banks, Cecil L. Brower, Sollie Isaac Fott, Lillian Vann Hunt: violin Felton Jarvis: producer	"Bye Baby Bye Bye" "Just a Lonely Man" "When I'm Walking (Let Me Walk)" "Forever, Forever"
1 May 1963
Bill Justis: leader, arranger Roy Montrell: guitar, contractor Jerry Glenn Kennedy, Wayne Moss: guitar Henry P. Strzelecki: Fender bass William Paul Ackerman: percussion Murray M. "Buddy" Harman, Jr.: drums Jerry D. Smith: organ Homer Louis "Boots" Randolph: saxophone Cameron "LaVelle" Muillins, George M. Tidwell III: trumpet Brenton Bolden Banks, George Binkley III, Cecil L. Brower, Lillian Vann Hunt, Bryan Lindsey: violin Felton Jarvis: producer	"Song for Rosemary" (instr.) "Red Sails in the Sunset" "Tell Me Truth, Baby"
2 May 1963
Bill Justis: leader, arranger Roy Montrell: guitar, contractor Jerry Glenn Kennedy, Wayne Moss: guitar Henry P. Strzelecki: Fender bass William Paul Ackerman: percussion Murray M. "Buddy" Harman, Jr.: drums Jerry D. Smith: organ Homer Louis "Boots" Randolph: saxophone Cameron "LaVelle" Muillins, George M. Tidwell III: trumpet Felton Jarvis: producer	"Land of 1,000 Dances" "I'm Living Right" "Who Cares"
9 January 1964
Fats Domino: vocals, piano James Booker: piano Bill Justis: leader, arranger Roy Montrell, Jerry Glenn Kennedy: guitar Charlie McCoy: guitar; vibes in "The Land of Make-Believe"; Henry P. Strzelecki: Fender bass Clarence Brown, Kenneth R. Buttrey: drums Hargus M. "Pig" Robbins: organ Herbert "Herb" Hardesty: tenor saxophone Homer Louis "Boots" Randolph: baritone saxophone Dana M. King: trombone Cameron "LaVelle" Muillins, George M. Tidwell III: trumpet Brenton Bolden Banks, George Binkley III, Cecil L. Brower, Lillian Vann Hunt, Howard Ralph Carpenter: violin Felton Jarvis: producer	"Something You Got Baby" "I'm a Fool to Care" "The Land of Make-Believe"
10 January 1964
Fats Domino: vocals, piano James Booker: piano Bill Justis: leader, arranger Roy Montrell, Jerry Glenn Kennedy, Wayne Moss: guitar Charlie McCoy: guitar; harmonica in "If You Don't Know What Love Is"; Henry P. Strzelecki: Fender bass Clarence Brown, Murray M. "Buddy" Harman, Jr.: drums Herbert "Herb" Hardesty: tenor saxophone Quitman Dennis: saxophone Dana M. King: trombone Cameron "LaVelle" Muillins, George M. Tidwell III: trumpet Felton Jarvis: producer	"Old Man Trouble" "Mary Oh Mary" "If You Don't Know What Love Is"
11 January 1964
Fats Domino: vocals, piano James Booker: piano Bill Justis: leader, arranger Roy Montrell, Wayne Moss: guitar Charlie McCoy: guitar; harmonica in "The Fat Man"; organ in "Love Me"; Henry P. Strzelecki: Fender bass Clarence Brown: drums William Paul Ackerman: percussion Quitman Dennis: saxophone Herbert "Herb" Hardesty: tenor saxophone Homer Louis "Boots" Randolph: baritone saxophone Dana M. King: trombone Cameron "LaVelle" Muillins, George M. Tidwell III: trumpet Brenton Bolden Banks, George Binkley III, Cecil L. Brower, Lillian Vann Hunt: violin Felton Jarvis: producer	"Fats Shuffle" (instr.) "The Fat Man" "Gotta Get a Job" "Fats on Fire" (instr.) "Love Me" "Packin' Up"
13 January 1964
Fats Domino: vocals, piano James Booker: piano Bill Justis: leader, arranger Roy Montrell, Jerry Glenn Kennedy: guitar Charlie McCoy: guitar Henry P. Strzelecki: Fender bass William Paul Ackerman: percussion Clarence Brown, Murray M. "Buddy" Harman, Jr.: drums Hargus M. "Pig" Robbins: organ Quitman Dennis: saxophone Herbert "Herb" Hardesty: tenor saxophone, contractor Homer Louis "Boots" Randolph: baritone saxophone Dana M. King: trombone Cameron "LaVelle" Muillins: trumpet George M. Tidwell III: trumpet, contractor Brenton Bolden Banks, George Binkley III, Cecil L. Brower, Lillian Vann Hunt, Howard Ralph Carpenter: violin Felton Jarvis: producer	"Valley of Tears" "You Know I Miss You" "Lazy Lady" "I Don't Want to Set the World on Fire"
24 June 1964
Bill Justis: arranger Felton Jarvis: producer Tommy Strong: engineer	"(All of My Life) For You" "Sally Was a Good Old Girl"
25 June 1964
Bill Justis: arranger Felton Jarvis: producer Tommy Strong: engineer	"A Whole Lot of Trouble" "That Certain Someone"
**Baker Studio, Oasis Motel, 2000 Admiral Wilson Boulevard, Camden, New Jersey**
8 September 1964
Fats Domino, Dave Bartholomew: arranger Felton Jarvis: producer Norman Baker: engineer	"Kansas City" "Heartbreak Hill" "I Met the Girl I'm Gonna Marry" "Ballin' the Jack"
**Cosimo Recording Studio, 523 Governor Nicholls Street, New Orleans, Louisiana**
7 January 1965 (3 sessions)
Bill Justis: arranger Felton Jarvis: producer	"Trouble in Mind" "Monkey Business" "Reeling and Rocking" "Why Don't You Do Right" "Man That's All" "Wigs" "On a Slow Boat to China" "When My Dreamboat Comes Home"
**United Recording Corporation, 3143 Industrial Boulevard, Las Vegas, Nevada**
15 February 1965
Fats Domino: vocals, piano Ron DiFillips: piano Sid Feller: arranger Roy Montrell: leader, guitar Don Overberg, Richard Eliot: guitar Billy Christ: bass Cornelius "Tenoo" Coleman: drums Bill Christ, Jack Ehlash: saxophone Carl Kalash, Ben Zimberoff, Arturo Romero, Louis Pressman, Louis Gelsin, Lewis Elias, Tony Maratea, Sam Albert, Harold Lieberman: violin Ennio Bolognini, Claire Warshaw: cello Bill Justis: producer	"Let Me Call You Sweetheart" "Goodnight Sweetheart"

==== Mercury ====
Fats Domino recorded for Mercury Records in June 1965. Only two singles have been released by this label.

Personnel	Recorded titles
**Las Vegas, Nevada**
3 or 12 June 1965
Ed Townsend: producer	"I Left My Heart in San Francisco" "I Done Got Over It"
12 June 1965
Ed Townsend: producer	"Don't Play with My Heart" "Blues so Bad" "What's That You Got?" "It's Never Too Late" "St. Louis Blues"

==== Broadmoor ====
Domino recorded at Broadmoor Records in September 1967. Only two singles have been released by this label. Later these recordings were sold to Reprise Records which released them in 1971 as LP album Fats.

Personnel	Recorded titles
**Jazz City Studio, 748 Camp Street, New Orleans, Louisiana**
2 and 3 September 1967
Roy Montrell: guitar James "Jimmie" Davis: bass Clarence Brown: drums Herbert "Herb" Hardesty, Robert "Buddy" Hagans, Nat Perrilliat, Walter Kimble: tenor saxophone Clarence Ford: baritone saxophone Dave Bartholomew: trumpet, producer	"Big Mouth" "I'm Going to Cross That River" "It's a Sin to Tell a Lie" "I'm Going to Help a Friend" "When You're Smiling" "These Old Shoes" "Work My Way up Steady" "The Lady in Black"
13 September 1967
Dave Bartholomew: producer	"Wait Till It Happens to You" "Man That's All" "Lawdy Miss Clawdy" "Help Me"

==== Reprise ====
Domino recorded at Reprise Records from May 1968 to June 1970. These recordings have been released on many singles and on LP album Fats Is Back (1968). Complete Broadmoor and Reprise recordings have been released in 2005 on CD compilation Sweet Patootie.

Personnel	Recorded titles
**New York City, New York**
May 1968
Fats Domino: vocals only; except plays piano on "I'm Ready"; Randy Newman, James Booker: piano Larry Knechtel: keyboards Eric Gale: guitar Chuck Rainey: bass Herb Lovelle, Hal Blaine, Earl Palmer: drums King Curtis: saxophone Randy Newman, John Andrews: horns arranger The Blossoms: background vocals The Holy Mackerel: handclaps Richard Perry: producer	"One for the Highway" "Honest Papas Love Their Mamas Better" "I Know" "My Old Friends" "I'm Ready" "So Swell When You're Well" "Wait Till It Happens to You" "Lovely Rita" "Lady Madonna" "One More Song for You" "Make Me Belong to You"
**Unknown place**
Probably December 1968
Richard Perry: producer	"Everybody's Got Something to Hide Except Me and My Monkey"
Probably August 1969
Richard Perry: producer	"Have You Seen My Baby?"
**TTG Studios, Los Angeles, California**
June 1970
Fred Smith: producer	"Sweet Patootie" "New Orleans Ain't the Same" "Can't Chase a Dream Forever" "Blues so Bad"

==== Various labels ====
Personnel	Recorded titles
**Sea-Saint Studios, 3809 Clematis Street, New Orleans, Louisiana**
May 1978
Roy Montrell: guitar, bass Ronald Johnson: guitar Tony Broussard: bass Smokey Johnson, Herman Ernest III: drums Reggie Hall: organ Lee Allen, Fred Kemp: tenor saxophone Bill Boskent, Fats Domino: producer	"If I Get Rich" "My Old Time Used to Be" "Any Old Time" "Shame on You" "Sleeping on the Job" "The Girl I Love" "Move with the Groove" (instr.) "After Hours" (instr.) "I Almost Lost My Mind" "Just Can't Get New Orleans" "Love Me" "Something About You Baby"
**Las Vegas, Nevada**
30 June 1980
Snuff Garrett: producer	"Whiskey Heaven"
**Big Mo Studio, Silver Springs (North of Washington), Maryland**
1 August 1983
David Douglas, Jimmy Moliere: guitar David Hyde: bass Raymond Weber: drums Bill Boskent, Fats Domino: producer	"Ain't It a Shame" "There You Go" "Three Fools" "It Makes No Difference Now" "Had My Fun" "Get Your Business" "Every Night About This Time" "Matter of Time" "If I Didn't Love You So"
**Ultrasonic Studios, New Orleans, Louisiana**
30 April 1985
Fats Domino: vocals, piano Doug Kershaw: vocals; fiddle in "My Toot Toot"; Robert Vernon: producer	"My Toot Toot" "Don't Mess with My Popeye's"
March 1992
Fats Domino: vocals, piano, producer Leo Williams: guitar Clarence Brown, Smokey Johnson: drums Herbert "Herb" Hardesty, Fred Kemp, Stacy Cole, Anadee Castanel, Elliot Callier: horn	"I Told Santa Claus" "Christmas Is a Special Day" "Jingle Bells" "I'll Be Home for Christmas" "Silver Bells" "Frosty the Snowman" "Rudolph the Red-Nosed Reindeer" "Blue Christmas" "Silent Night" "White Christmas" "Please Come Home for Christmas" "Amazing Grace"
January 2000
Fats Domino: vocals, piano, producer Carl LeBlanc: guitar Ervin Charles: bass Brian Brignac: drums Roger Pauly: electronic keyboards Jerry Embree: alto saxophone Herbert "Herb" Hardesty, Jon Smith: tenor saxophone Roger Lewis: baritone saxophone Marshall Cyr: trumpet	"Alive and Kickin'" "Love You Till the Day I Die" "I'll Be Alright" "Give Me Some" "One Step at a Time" "Home USA" "Four Leaf Clover" "This Is My Story" "You Made a Vow" "I Love You"
**Dockside Studio, Maurice, Louisiana**
Summer 2002
Sonny Landreth: slide guitar	"I Spent All My Money Loving You"

=== Alphabetical list of studio recordings ===
The table below lists in alphabetical order all studio recordings by Fats Domino (including unreleased recordings and alternative titles), together with references to the songwriters, recording dates and the first release of each recording. Alternative takes, mono and stereo recordings, edited and overdubbed recordings are listed separately. Take numbers are given for those cases when they could be properly attributed.

The table also includes recordings issued only on unofficial (bootleg) releases.

Title

The most common title of a recording (usually used in album) is chosen as its main title, presented in bold italics in the column "Title". Alternate (or shortened, or erroneous) titles of such recording are given in italics in the same column and with reference to the main title, without any additional attributes. All attributes of a recording (column "Attr.") are given only with respect to its main title.

Instrumental compositions are marked "instr." in parentheses after the title.

Recordings, which have been attributed in some releases to Fats Domino but which had been in fact made without his participation (e.g., by Fats Domino band) are listed in italics with appropriate explanations.

Version

- Different songs

Some titles of Fats Domino recordings actually refer each to two or even three different songs. These recordings are labeled in the column "Version" by Roman numerals as Song I, Song II and Song III in chronological order of recording.

- Different versions

Some songs were recorded in different sessions. These recordings are labeled in the column "Version" as Version 1 and Version 2 in chronological order of recording.

- Different takes

The cases when the take numbers are known are quite rare. Usually distinctive takes are shown as follows: when a take is released on a single and/or album, it is a master take (Master in the column "Version"), otherwise it is an alternate take (Alternate).

Single and album masters can be different, in these cases the words Single and Album are added respectively before the word "master".

When the take number is known, it is added in the column "Version" for information, such as Take #.

Attributes

- Mono and stereo

All listed recordings have attribute "Stereo" (s) or "Mono" (m). When a recording was released in both forms, it is listed twice, both as mono and as stereo.

- Electronically re-recorded for simulate stereo: Liberty albums

Though Fats Domino recorded at Imperial about 70 titles in stereo, only two his Imperial albums (24 tracks in total) have been released in stereo (simultaneously with their mono versions): ...A Lot of Dominos! (Imperial LP-12066, 1960) and Let the Four Winds Blow (Imperial LP-12073, 1961). All other originally issued stereo recordings were released by Imperial as mono mixes, together with original mono recordings on the same mono LP albums.

The label Imperial was sold to Liberty Records, Inc. in 1964. Liberty was purchased by United Artists in 1968. All mono Imperial albums and compilations by Fats Domino were reissued in late 1960s under label Imperial with the mention of Liberty, labelled as "Stereo" and with the notification "Electronically re-recorded for simulate stereo" (or similar) on back cover, such as first album Rock and Rollin' with Fats Domino (Imperial LP-12387, 1969) originally issued in 1956.

Unfortunately, even the stereo recordings (previously released by Imperial as mono mixes on mono albums) are present on these Liberty albums as mono mixes, electronically re-recorded for simulate stereo, and not as true stereo recordings (what could the buyer hope for, after reading the inscription "Stereo" on labels).

These "electronically created stereo" recordings are not reviewed in this article, as they have no additional sound material as compared to the original mono recording and were always issued after the release of each respective mono variant.

- Stereo remixes

Imperial has released two stereo albums without any remixing, just as this sound was recorded (generally vocals and piano appearing in one channel, and other instruments in the other).

Subsequently on most compilations these recordings were remixed for release. Thus, both boxes by Bear Family, released with an interval of 26 years but almost identical in terms of Imperial material (except for a few entries having "restored speed", which will be discussed below) include all stereo recordings not in their original format, but as remixes. Sometimes these remixes are almost indistinguishable from mono recording (such as Magic Isles) or are undeniably mono recording (such as Your Cheating Heart). Unfortunately, most of compilers avoid mentioning whether the recordings they include are original stereo, or stereo remixes or mono, and they avoid mentioning the word "stereo" in their booklets at all, so the analysis has to be done exclusively by listening.

The stereo remixes are listed here with attribute "Remix" (r) in the column "Attr." only if they were released before the original (not remixed) stereo recordings.

- Edits

Some recordings were edited for release (for single or album). The edited recordings are listed separately with attribute "Edited" (ed), except for compilations, where they are not considered.

- Composite tracks

Some released tracks (including masters) were made from the original recording by duplicating part of it and then splicing. Such tracks are called composite (cm).

- Overdubs

Some recordings were overdubbed for release (by chorus, or by instruments, or by hand claps, or by factitious audience noise for simulate live recording). The overdubbed recordings are listed separately with one of attributes: by chorus (oc), by drums (od), by hand claps (oh), by some instruments (oi), by public noise (op), by saxophone (ox), by strings (os).

When a recording has more than one attribute, they are listed with a hyphen, e.g., s-ed-oc-os.

- Restored speed (key)

Often a recording was speeded-up for release, and some compilers claim that in their release it was restored to its original performance key and speed.

Unfortunately, these statements are difficult to verify, and there are also great doubts about this issue in relation to other entries, so these versions are not listed here.

First release

Usually, both single (as label and catalog number) and album (as title in italics) are listed, following by the year of release.

Some recordings have been released only on compilations. In these cases, compilation is listed as album (title in italics, year of release).

First releases of the same version with different attributes are listed in chronological order of release.

Title	Songwriter(s)	Recording date	Version	Attr.	First release
"9th Ward Blues" (instr.)	Not by Fats Domino				
**"44"** (Note: Not to be confused with the blues standard of the same name "Forty-Four".)	A. Domino, D. Bartholomew	19 September 1953		m	The Fabulous "Mr. D" (1958)
**"(All of My Life) For You"**	A. Domino, D. Bartholomew	24 June 1964		m	ABC 45-10584 (1964) (Note: Titled "For You".), The Best of Fats Domino! (1966)
**"(All of My Life) For You"**	A. Domino, D. Bartholomew	24 June 1964		s	The Best! (1979)
"(I Met) The Girl I'm Gonna Marry"	→ "The Girl I'm Gonna Marry"				
"A Long Way from Home"	→ "Helping Hand"				
**"A Whole Lot of Trouble"**	A. Domino, D. Bartholomew	25 June 1964		m	The Best of Fats Domino! (1966)
**"After Hours"** (instr.)	Avery Parrish	May 1978		s	Sonet (GB) SON 2168 (1978)
**"After Hours / I Almost Lost My Mind"** (Note: This composite track is a splice of first 2'42" of "After Hours" (released on single in complete form) and of "I Almost Lost My Mind" (not released as separate track).)	Avery Parrish / J. Hunter	May 1978		s	Sleeping on the Job (1979)
"After Hours / When I Lost My Baby"	→ "After Hours / I Almost Lost My Mind"				
**"Ain't Gonna Do It"**	D. Bartholomew, Pearl King	28 March 1961		m	What a Party! (1961)
**"Ain't Gonna Do It"**	D. Bartholomew, Pearl King	28 March 1961		m-oc	Here He Comes Again! (1963)
**"Ain't It a Shame"**	A. Domino, D. Bartholomew	15 March 1955	Version 1	m	Imperial 5348 (1955), Rock and Rollin' with Fats Domino (1956)
**"Ain't It a Shame"**	A. Domino, D. Bartholomew	15 March 1955	Version 1	m-oc	Let's Dance with Domino (1963)
**"Ain't It a Shame"**	A. Domino, D. Bartholomew	1 August 1983	Version 2 (Note: Titled "Ain't That a Shame 2000".)	s	Alive and Kickin' (2006)
**"Ain't It Good"**	A. Domino, D. Bartholomew	1 June 1953		m	Let's Play Fats Domino (1959)
"Ain't That a Shame"	→ "Ain't It a Shame"				
"Ain't That Just a Woman"	→ "Ain't That Just Like a Woman"				
**"Ain't That Just Like a Woman"**	Claude Demetrius, Fleecie Moore	28 December 1960		m-ed	Imperial 5723 (1961), I Miss You So (1961)
**"Ain't That Just Like a Woman"**	Claude Demetrius, Fleecie Moore	28 December 1960		s-ed	"They Call Me The Fat Man..." (1991)
**"Ain't That Just Like a Woman"**	Claude Demetrius, Fleecie Moore	28 December 1960		s	Out of New Orleans (1993)
**"Alive and Kickin'"**	A. Domino, R. Pauly	January 2000		s	Alive and Kickin' (2006)
**"All by Myself"**	A. Domino, D. Bartholomew	15 March 1955		m	Imperial 5357 (1955), Rock and Rollin' with Fats Domino (1956)
**"Along the Navajo Trail"**	Dick Charles, Lawrence Markes	20 June 1961		m	Let the Four Winds Blow (mono) (1961)
**"Along the Navajo Trail"**	Dick Charles, Lawrence Markes	20 June 1961		s	Let the Four Winds Blow (stereo) (1961)
**"Along the Navajo Trail"**	Dick Charles, Lawrence Markes	20 June 1961		m-oc	Here He Comes Again! (1963)
**"Am I Blue"**	Harry Akst, Grant Clarke	6 August 1961		m	Let the Four Winds Blow (mono) (1961)
**"Am I Blue"**	Harry Akst, Grant Clarke	6 August 1961		s	Let the Four Winds Blow (stereo) (1961)
**"Amazing Grace"**	traditional	March 1992		s	Christmas Is a Special Day (1993)
"Another Mule"	→ "Man That's All"				
**"Any Old Time"**	Jimmie Rodgers	May 1978		s	Sleeping on the Job (1979)
**"Any Old Time"**	Jimmie Rodgers	May 1978		s-od	The Fat Man (1996)
"Are You Going My Way"	→ "Little School Girl"				
**"As Time Goes By"** (instr.)	Herman Hupfeld	20 February 1957		m	This Is Fats (1957)
**"Baby Please"**	A. Domino, D. Bartholomew	14 March 1954		m	Imperial 5283 (1954), This Is Fats (1957)
**"Bad Luck and Trouble"**	A. Domino, Jimmy Donley, Pee Wee Maddux	23 March 1961		m-ed	What a Party! (1961)
**"Bad Luck and Trouble"**	A. Domino, Jimmy Donley, Pee Wee Maddux	23 March 1961		s	"They Call Me The Fat Man..." (1991)
**"Ballin' the Jack"**	Arranged by A. Domino	8 September 1964		m	Getaway with Fats Domino (mono) (1965), Getaway with Fats Domino (stereo) (1965)
**"Barrel House"** (instr.)	A. Domino, D. Bartholomew	27 October 1953		m	The Fabulous "Mr. D" (1958)
**"Be My Guest"**	A. Domino, Tommy Boyce, John Marascalco	26 September 1959		m-ed	Imperial X5629 (1959), Fats Domino Sings Million Record Hits (1960)
**"Be My Guest"**	A. Domino, Tommy Boyce, John Marascalco	26 September 1959		s	My Blue Heaven: The Best Vol. 1 (1990)
**"Before I Grow Too Old"**	A. Domino, D. Bartholomew, Robert Guidry	10 February 1960		m	Imperial X5660 (1960), What a Party! (1961)
**"Big Mouth"**	A. Domino, D. Bartholomew	2–3 September 1967		m	Broadmoor 105 (1968)
**"Big Mouth"**	A. Domino, D. Bartholomew	2–3 September 1967		s	Fats (1971)
**"Birds & Bees"**	A. Domino, D. Bartholomew	2 November 1961		m	Just Domino (1962)
**"Birds & Bees"**	A. Domino, D. Bartholomew	2 November 1961		s	"They Call Me The Fat Man..." (1991)
**"Blue Christmas"**	Billy Hayes, Jay W. Johnson	March 1992		s	Christmas Is a Special Day (1993)
**"Blue Monday"**	A. Domino, D. Bartholomew	30 March 1955		m	Imperial 5417 (1956), This Is Fats Domino! (1956)
**"Blueberry Hill"**	A. Domino, D. Bartholomew	27 June 1956	78 rpm master	m (Note: Undamaged recording of "Blueberry Hill" with the word "we" on the phrase "Vows we made" at 01:04 of the track.)	Imperial 5407 (1956)
**"Blueberry Hill"**	A. Domino, D. Bartholomew	27 June 1956	45 rpm & 1st album master	m-ed (Note: Master of "Blueberry Hill" used for 45rpm single Imperial X5407 and for the first issue of Imperial album This Is Fats Domino! in 1956 was made with damaged studio tape: sound floating is heard at 01:04 of track, on the words "we made" of the phrase "Vows we made".)	Imperial X5407 (1956), This Is Fats Domino! (1956)
**"Blueberry Hill"**	A. Domino, D. Bartholomew	27 June 1956	2nd album master	m-cm (Note: Composite master of "Blueberry Hill" widely used since 1958 starting by Imperial compilation Fats Domino Swings (12,000,000 Records) was made by replacing of floating words "we made" of the phrase "Vows we made" at 1:04 of the track with the words "you made" from the phrase "Vows you made" of the next verse of the song.)	Fats Domino Swings (12,000,000 Records) (1958)
**"Blues so Bad"**	A. Domino, D. Bartholomew	12 June 1965	Version 1	m	Fats Domino '65: What's That You Got? (2006) (Note: Titled "I Got the Blues so Bad for New Orleans".)
**"Blues so Bad"**	A. Domino, D. Bartholomew	3 July 1970	Version 2	m	Sweet Patootie (2005)
**"Bo Weevil"**	A. Domino, D. Bartholomew	7 November 1955	Master	m-cm-ed	Imperial 5375 (1956), Rock and Rollin' with Fats Domino (1956)
**"Bo Weevil"**	A. Domino, D. Bartholomew	7 November 1955		m-cm (Note: Mistakenly called "extended" or "complete" version. Master was obtained by editing (fading-out) of this composite track.)	A Rage in Harlem (1991)
**"Bo Weevil"**	A. Domino, D. Bartholomew	7 November 1955		m (Note: Original recording, mistakenly called "alternate" version.)	"They Call Me The Fat Man..." (1991)
**"Boogie Woogie Baby"**	D. Bartholomew	7 January 1950		m	Imperial 5065 (1950)
**"Brand New Baby"**	D. Bartholomew	7 January 1950		m	Imperial 5085 (1950), Here Stands Fats Domino (1957) (Note: Titled "New Baby".)
**"Bye Baby, Bye, Bye"**	A. Domino	23 April 1963		m	Here Comes... Fats Domino (mono) (1963)
**"Bye Baby, Bye, Bye"**	A. Domino	23 April 1963		s	Here Comes... Fats Domino (stereo) (1963)
**"Can't Chase a Dream Forever"**		3 July 1970		m	Sweet Patootie (2005)
**"Can't Go On Without You"**	A. Domino, D. Randazzo	21 April 1963		m	ABC 45-10444 (1963), Here Comes... Fats Domino (mono) (1963)
**"Can't Go On Without You"**	A. Domino, D. Randazzo	21 April 1963		s	Here Comes... Fats Domino (stereo) (1963)
**"Careless Love"**	traditional	February 1951		m	Imperial 5145 (1951)
**"Careless Love"**	traditional	February 1951		m-ed (Note: Same take as on single, but without instrumental intro (30"). This is a rare case when album track is shorter than single one.)	Fats Domino Rock and Rollin' (1956)
**"Cheatin'"**	A. Domino	26 April 1952		m	Imperial 5220 (1953), Here Stands Fats Domino (1957)
**"Christmas Is a Special Day"**	A. Domino	March 1992		s	Christmas Is a Special Day (1993)
**"Coquette"**	Carmen Lombardo, Johnny Green, Gus Kahn	15 August 1958		m	Imperial 5553 (1958), What a Party! (1961)
**"Country Boy"**	A. Domino, D. Bartholomew	4 November 1958	Single master	m	Imperial X5645 (1960)
**"Country Boy"**	A. Domino, D. Bartholomew	4 November 1958	Album master	m	Fats Domino Sings Million Record Hits (1960)
**"Country Boy"**	A. Domino, D. Bartholomew	4 November 1958	Album master	r	Out of New Orleans (1993)
**"Country Boy"**	A. Domino, D. Bartholomew	4 November 1958	Album master	s	Walking to New Orleans (box) (2002)
**"Dance with Mr. Domino"**	A. Domino, D. Bartholomew	14 April 1962	Take 5	m-ed	Imperial 5863 (1962), Just Domino (1962)
**"Dance with Mr. Domino"**	A. Domino, D. Bartholomew	14 April 1962	Take 5	s	"They Call Me The Fat Man..." (1991)
**"Darktown Strutters' Ball"**	Shelton Brooks	30 October 1958		s	Don't You Know? (1987)
**"Detroit City Blues"**	A. Domino, D. Bartholomew	10 December 1949		m	Imperial 5058 (1950), Here Stands Fats Domino (1957)
**"Did You Ever See a Dream Walking?"**	Harry Revel, Mack Gordon	11 September 1961	Take 3	m	What a Party! (1961), Imperial X5875 (1962)
**"Did You Ever See a Dream Walking?"**	Harry Revel, Mack Gordon	11 September 1961	Take 3	s	"They Call Me The Fat Man..." (1991)
**"Do You Know What It Means** **to Miss New Orleans?"**	Louis Alter, Eddie DeLange	6 November 1961		m	Twistin' the Stomp (1962)
**"Domino Stomp"** (instr.)	A. Domino	18 April 1953		m	Twistin' the Stomp (1962)
**"Don't Blame It on Me"**	A. Domino, D. Bartholomew	7 November 1955		m	Rock and Rollin' with Fats Domino (1956)
**"Don't Come Knockin'"**	A. Domino	23 or 30 April 1960	Take 12	m-ed-os	Imperial 5675 (1960),...A Lot of Dominos! (mono) (1960)
**"Don't Come Knockin'"**	A. Domino	23 or 30 April 1960	Take 12	s-ed-os	...A Lot of Dominos! (stereo) (1960)
**"Don't Come Knockin'"**	A. Domino	23 or 30 April 1960	Take 12	s	The Originals, Vol. 10 (1995)
**"Don't Deceive Me"**	A. Domino, D. Bartholomew	25 January 1957		m	Twistin' the Stomp (1962)
**"Don't Know What's Wrong"**	A. Domino	25 May 1956	Version 1	m	Rare Dominos Volume Two (1971)
**"Don't Know What's Wrong"**	A. Domino	21 June 1956	Version 2 (Note: Titled "The Twist Set Me Free".), take 10	m	Twistin' the Stomp (1962)
**"Don't Leave Me This Way"**	A. Domino, D. Bartholomew	2 September 1953		m	Imperial 5262 (1953)
"Don't Lie to Me"	→ "Don't You Lie to Me"				
**"Don't Mess with My Popeye's"** (with Doug Kershaw) (Note: Same backing instrumental track as on "My Toot Toot (Rock)".)	Terrance Simien	30 April 1985		s	Toot Toot 2 (1985)
**"Don't Play with My Heart"**	A. Domino, D. Bartholomew	12 June 1965		m	Fats Domino '65: What's That You Got? (2006)
**"Don't You Hear Me Calling You"**	A. Domino, D. Bartholomew	13 August 1954		m	Imperial 5313 (1954), This Is Fats (1957)
**"Don't You Know"**	A. Domino, D. Bartholomew	27 January 1955		m	Imperial 5340 (1955)
**"Don't You Know I Love You"**	A. Domino, D. Bartholomew	28 January 1958		m	Imperial 5492 (1958), Let's Dance with Domino (1963)
**"Don't You Lie to Me"**	Hudson Whittaker, A. Domino	February 1951		m	Imperial 5123 (1951)
**"Dreaming"** (instr.)	D. Bartholomew	10 September 1952		m	Imperial 5209 (1952)
**"Easter Parade"**	Irving Berlin	18 June 1959		m	I Miss You So (1961)
**"Easter Parade"**	Irving Berlin	18 June 1959		s	Out of New Orleans (1993)
"Every Night"	→ "Every Night About This Time"				
**"Every Night About This Time"**	A. Domino, D. Bartholomew	September 1950	Version 1	m	Imperial 5099 (1950), Here Stands Fats Domino (1957)
**"Every Night About This Time"**	A. Domino, D. Bartholomew	4 November 1958	Version 2 (Note: Titled "Every Night".), take 8	m	Twistin' the Stomp (1962)
**"Every Night About This Time"**	A. Domino, D. Bartholomew	4 November 1958	Version 2, take 8	m-oc	Here He Comes Again! (1963)
**"Every Night About This Time"**	A. Domino, D. Bartholomew	1 August 1983	Version 3	s-od-ox	Alive and Kickin' (2006)
**"Every Night About This Time"**	A. Domino, D. Bartholomew	1 August 1983	Version 3	s	Give Me Some! (2009)
**"Everybody's Got Something to Hide**; **Except Me and My Monkey"**	John Lennon, Paul McCartney	December 1968		m	Reprise 0810 (1969)
"Fat Man"	→ "The Fat Man"				
**"Fat's Frenzy"** (instr.)	A. Domino, D. Bartholomew	2 September 1953		m	Fats Domino Rock and Rollin' (1956)
"Fats Blues" (instr.)	Not by Fats Domino				
**"Fats Domino Blues"** (instr.)	A. Domino	January 1951		m	Rare Dominos (1968) (Note: This is the track B8 mislabeled on the track list "Don't Leave Me This Way". The track B5 titled there "Fats Domino Blues" is in fact unknown instrumental not by Fats Domino. This unknown instrumental is also mislabeled "Fats Blues" on the CD compilation The Originals, Vol. 6 and "9th Ward Blues" on The Originals, Vol. 8.)
**"Fats on Fire"** (instr.)	A. Domino, Herb Hardesty	11 January 1964		m	Fats on Fire (mono) (1964)
**"Fats on Fire"** (instr.)	A. Domino, Herb Hardesty	11 January 1964		s	Fats on Fire (stereo) (1964)
**"Fats Shuffle"** (instr.)	A. Domino	11 January 1964		m	Fats on Fire (mono) (1964)
**"Fats Shuffle"** (instr.)	A. Domino	11 January 1964		s	Fats on Fire (stereo) (1964)
**"Fell in Love on Monday"**	A. Domino	28 December 1960		m-oc	Imperial X5734 (1961), I Miss You So (1961)
**"Fell in Love on Monday"**	A. Domino	28 December 1960		s-oc	"They Call Me The Fat Man..." (1991)
**"Fell in Love on Monday"**	A. Domino	28 December 1960		s	The Originals, Vol. 4 (1992)
"For You"	→ "(All of My Life) For You"				
**"Forever, Forever"**	A. Domino, J. Smith	23 April 1963		m	Here Comes... Fats Domino (mono) (1963)
**"Forever, Forever"**	A. Domino, J. Smith	23 April 1963		s	Here Comes... Fats Domino (stereo) (1963)
"Forty-Four"	→ "44"				
**"Four Leaf Clover"**	A. Domino	January 2000		s	Alive and Kickin' (2006)
**"Frosty the Snowman"**	Nelson, Rollins	March 1992	Album master	s	Christmas Is a Special Day (1993)
**"Frosty the Snowman"**	Nelson, Rollins	March 1992	Single master	s	The Right Stuff S7-724381976876 (1997)
**"Get Your Business"**		1 August 1983		s	Give Me Some! (2009)
**"Give Me Some"**	A. Domino	January 2000		s	Alive and Kickin' (2006)
**"Give Me Some"**	A. Domino	January 2000		s-od	Give Me Some! (2009) (Note: This CD includes two alternate overdubs of "Give Me Some".)
**"Goin' Back Home"**	A. Domino, D. Bartholomew	19 September 1953		m	Walking to New Orleans (1963)
**"Goin' Home"**	A. Domino, Al Young	November 1951 or January 1952	Version 1	m	Imperial 45-5180 (1952), Rock and Rollin' with Fats Domino (1956)
**"Goin' Home"**	A. Domino, Al Young	5 January 1962	Version 2	m	Just Domino (1962)
**"Goin' Home"**	A. Domino, Al Young	5 January 1962	Version 2	m-oc	Here He Comes Again! (1963)
**"Going to the River"**	A. Domino, D. Bartholomew	December 1952 or January 1953		m	Imperial 5231 (1953), Rock and Rollin' with Fats Domino (1956)
**"Good Hearted Man"**	A. Domino, D. Bartholomew	6 June 1961		m-ed	Let the Four Winds Blow (mono) (1961), Imperial X5764 (1961)
**"Good Hearted Man"**	A. Domino, D. Bartholomew	6 June 1961		s-ed	Let the Four Winds Blow (stereo) (1961)
**"Good Hearted Man"**	A. Domino, D. Bartholomew	6 June 1961		s	Walking to New Orleans (box) (2002)
**"Goodbye"**	A. Domino, D. Bartholomew	February 1953		m	Fats Domino Rock and Rollin' (1956)
**"Goodnight Sweetheart"**	Ray Noble, Jimmy Campbell and Reg Connelly	15 February 1965		m	ABC 45-10644 (1965), The Best of Fats Domino! (1966)
**"Goodnight Sweetheart"**	Ray Noble, Jimmy Campbell and Reg Connelly	15 February 1965		s	The Best! (1979)
**"Had My Fun"**		1 August 1983		s	Give Me Some! (2009)
**"Hands Across the Table"**	Jean Delettre, Mitchell Parish	30 October 1958	Master	m	Let's Play Fats Domino (1959), Imperial 5895 (1962)
**"Hands Across the Table"**	Jean Delettre, Mitchell Parish	30 October 1958	Alternate	s	Out of New Orleans (1993)
**"Have You Seen My Baby?"**	Randy Newman	August 1969		m-ed	Reprise 0891 (1970)
**"Have You Seen My Baby?"**	Randy Newman	August 1969		s	Sweet Patootie (2005)
**"Heartbreak Hill"**	A. Domino, Al Downing	8 October 1964		m	ABC 45-10596 (1964), Getaway with Fats Domino (mono) (1965)
**"Heartbreak Hill"**	A. Domino, Al Downing	8 October 1964		s	Getaway with Fats Domino (stereo) (1965)
**"Help Me"** (Note: This song begins with the words: "My baby, I wonder where can she be".)	A. Domino, D. Bartholomew	15 March 1955	Song I, take 1	m	Rare Dominos Volume Two (1971)
**"Help Me"** (Note: This song begins with the words: "Help me, somebody help me".)	A. Domino, D. Bartholomew	13 September 1967	Song II	s	Sweet Patootie (2005)
**"Helping Hand"**	A. Domino, D. Bartholomew	27 January 1955		m	Imperial 5340 (1955), Twistin' the Stomp (1962) (Note: Titled "A Long Way from Home".)
"Hey Fat Man"	→ "Hey! Fat Man"				
"Hey La Bas"	→ "Hey! La Bas Boogie"				
**"Hey! Fat Man"**	A. Domino	September 1950		m	Here Stands Fats Domino (1957)
**"Hey! La Bas Boogie"**	D. Bartholomew	7 January 1950		m	Imperial 5085 (1950), This Is Fats (1957)
**"Hide Away Blues"**	A. Domino, D. Bartholomew	10 December 1949		m	Imperial 5077 (1950), Here Stands Fats Domino (1957)
**"Hold Hands"**	A. Domino, Jimmy Donley, Pee Wee Maddux	23 March 1961		m	What a Party! (1961)
**"Hold Hands"**	A. Domino, Jimmy Donley, Pee Wee Maddux	23 March 1961		s	Out of New Orleans (1993)
**"Home USA"**	A. Domino	January 2000		s	Alive and Kickin' (2006)
**"Honest Papas Love Their Mamas Better"**	Pasquale Zompa, Bernard DeCesare	May 1968		m	Reprise 0696 (1968)
**"Honest Papas Love Their Mamas Better"**	Pasquale Zompa, Bernard DeCesare	May 1968		s	Fats Is Back (1968)
**"Honey Chile"**	A. Domino, D. Bartholomew	27 June 1956		m	Imperial 5407 (1956), This Is Fats Domino! (1956)
**"How Can I Be Happy"**	A. Domino, D. Bartholomew	14 June 1958	Take 3	m	Walking to New Orleans (1963)
**"How Long"**	A. Domino, Al Young	November 1951 or January 1952	78 rpm master (Note: Later called "alternate".)	m	Imperial 5209 (1952), Rare Dominos Volume Two (1971)
**"How Long"**	A. Domino, Al Young	November 1951 or January 1952	45 rpm master	m	Imperial 45-5209 (1952), Rare Dominos (1968)
**"Howdy Podner"**	A. Domino, D. Bartholomew	30 November 1955		m	Let's Play Fats Domino (1959)
**"Hum Diddy Doo"**	A. Domino, Pearl King	14 April 1962		m-ed	Just Domino (1962), Imperial 5909 (1963)
**"Hum Diddy Doo"**	A. Domino, Pearl King	14 April 1962		s-ed	"They Call Me The Fat Man..." (1991)
**"Hum Diddy Doo"**	A. Domino, Pearl King	14 April 1962		s	Out of New Orleans (1993)
**"I Can't Give You Anything but Love"**	Jimmy McHugh, Dorothy Fields	6 June 1961		m	Let the Four Winds Blow (mono) (1961)
**"I Can't Give You Anything but Love"**	Jimmy McHugh, Dorothy Fields	6 June 1961		s	Let the Four Winds Blow (stereo) (1961)
**"I Can't Give You Anything but Love"**	Jimmy McHugh, Dorothy Fields	6 June 1961		m-oc	Here He Comes Again! (1963)
**"I Can't Go On"**	A. Domino, D. Bartholomew	15 October 1955		m	Imperial 5369 (1955), The Fabulous "Mr. D" (1958)
**"I Can't Go on This Way"**	Reginald Hall	23 December 1955		m-ed-os	Imperial 5980 (1963)
**"I Can't Go on This Way"**	Reginald Hall	23 December 1955		m-os	Don't You Know? (1987)
**"I Can't Go on This Way"**	Reginald Hall	23 December 1955		m	Out of New Orleans (1993)
**"I Don't Want to Set the World on Fire"**	Eddie Seiler, Sol Marcus, Bennie Benjamin, Eddie Durham	13 January 1964		m	Fats on Fire (mono) (1964), ABC 45-10531 (1964)
**"I Don't Want to Set the World on Fire"**	Eddie Seiler, Sol Marcus, Bennie Benjamin, Eddie Durham	13 January 1964		s	Fats on Fire (stereo) (1964)
"I Don't Want to Walk Without You"	Not by Fats Domino (Note: This title included in Let's Dance with Domino (1963) is recorded by Fats Domino band only.)				
**"I Done Got Over It"**	E. Kador	3 or 12 June 1965		m	Mercury 72463 (1965), Attention! Fats Domino! Vol. 2 (1970)
**"I Got a Right to Cry"**	Joe Liggins	21 April 1963		m	ABC 45-10475 (1963), Here Comes... Fats Domino (mono) (1963)
**"I Got a Right to Cry"**	Joe Liggins	21 April 1963		s	Here Comes... Fats Domino (stereo) (1963)
"I Got the Blues so Bad for New Orleans"	→ "Blues so Bad"				
**"I Guess I'll Be on My Way"**	A. Domino	10 September 1952		m	Walking to New Orleans (1963)
**"I Hear You Knocking"**	D. Bartholomew, Pearl King	4 November 1958	Take 5	m	I Miss You So (1961), Imperial 5796 (1961)
**"I Hear You Knocking"**	D. Bartholomew, Pearl King	4 November 1958	Take 5	s	"They Call Me The Fat Man..." (1991)
"I Just Can't Get (New Orleans Off My Mind)"	→ "Just Can't Get New Orleans (Off My Mind)"				
**"I Just Cry"**	A. Domino, D. Bartholomew	28 March 1961		m-ed	Imperial X5753 (1961), What a Party! (1961)
**"I Just Cry"**	A. Domino, D. Bartholomew	28 March 1961		s	Out of New Orleans (1993)
**"I Know"**	A. Domino, D. Bartholomew	10 July 1954	Song I	m	Imperial X5323 (1954), Twistin' the Stomp (1962)
**"I Know"** (Note: Original title of this song is "I Know (You Don't Love Me No More)".)	Barbara George	May 1968	Song II	s	Fats Is Back (1968)
**"I Left My Heart in San Francisco"**	George Cory, Douglas Cross	3 or 12 June 1965	Master	m	Mercury 72463 (1965), Attention! Fats Domino! Vol. 2 (1970)
**"I Left My Heart in San Francisco"**	George Cory, Douglas Cross	3 or 12 June 1965	Alternate	m	Fats Domino '65: What's That You Got? (2006)
**"I Lived My Life"**	A. Domino, D. Bartholomew	10 July 1954		m	Imperial 5301 (1954)
**"I Lived My Life"**	A. Domino, D. Bartholomew	10 July 1954		m-ed	Let's Dance with Domino (1963)
**"I Lived My Life"**	A. Domino, D. Bartholomew	10 July 1954		m-oc	The Originals, Vol. 11 (1995)
**"I Love Her"**	A. Domino, D. Bartholomew	December 1952 or January 1953		m	Fats Domino Rock and Rollin' (1956)
**"I Love You"**		January 2000		s	Give Me Some! (2009)
"I Met the Girl I'm Gonna Marry"	→ "The Girl I'm Gonna Marry"				
**"I Miss You So"**	Jimmy Henderson, Sid Robin, Bertha Scott	23 September 1958		m	I Miss You So (1961)
**"I Remember When"**		October 1961			Unreleased
**"I Spent All My Money Loving You"**	Robert Guidry	Summer 2002		s	Alive and Kickin' (2006)
**"I Still Love You"**	A. Domino, D. Bartholomew, Earl Palmer, Wilbur Watson	3 August 1957		m	Imperial X5467 (1957), Fats Domino Sings Million Record Hits (1960)
**"I Told Santa Claus"**	A. Domino	March 1992		s	Christmas Is a Special Day (1993)
**"I Want to Go Home"**	A. Domino	14 April 1962	Take 16	m	Just Domino (1962)
**"I Want to Go Home"**	A. Domino	14 April 1962	Take 16	s	"They Call Me The Fat Man..." (1991)
**"I Want to Walk You Home"**	A. Domino	18 June 1959		m	Imperial X5606 (1959), Let's Play Fats Domino (1959)
**"I Want to Walk You Home"**	A. Domino	18 June 1959		r	Out of New Orleans (1993)
**"I Want to Walk You Home"**	A. Domino	18 June 1959		s	Walking to New Orleans (box) (2002)
**"I Want You to Know"**	A. Domino, D. Bartholomew	6 October 1957		m	Imperial 5477 (1957), The Fabulous "Mr. D" (1958)
**"I'll Always Be in Love with You"**	Herman Ruby, Sam H. Stept, Bud Green	23 September 1958		m	I Miss You So (1961)
**"I'll Be All Right"**	A. Domino	January 2000		s	Alive and Kickin' (2006)
**"I'll Be Glad When You're Dead**; **You Rascal You"**	Sam Theard	17 April 1958		m	The Fabulous "Mr. D" (1958)
**"I'll Be Gone"**	A. Domino, Al Young	June 1951		m	Imperial 5167 (1952), Here Stands Fats Domino (1957)
**"I'll Be Home for Christmas"**	Kent, Gannon, Ram	March 1992		s	Christmas Is a Special Day (1993)
**"I'm a Fool to Care"**	Ted Daffan	9 January 1964		m	Fats on Fire (mono) (1964)
**"I'm a Fool to Care"**	Ted Daffan	9 January 1964		s	Fats on Fire (stereo) (1964)
**"I'm Alone Because I Love You"**	Ira Schuster, Joe Young	6 June 1961		m	Let the Four Winds Blow (mono) (1961)
**"I'm Alone Because I Love You"**	Ira Schuster, Joe Young	6 June 1961		s	Let the Four Winds Blow (stereo) (1961)
**"I'm Going to Cross That River"**	A. Domino, D. Bartholomew	2–3 September 1967		s	Fats (1971)
**"I'm Going to Help a Friend"**	A. Domino, D. Bartholomew	2–3 September 1967		s	Fats (1971)
**"I'm Gonna Be a Wheel Some Day"**	A. Domino, D. Bartholomew, Roy Hayes	14 June 1958		m	Imperial X5606 (1959), Let's Play Fats Domino (1959)
**"I'm in Love Again"**	A. Domino, D. Bartholomew	15 October 1955		m	Imperial 5386 (1956), Fats Domino Rock and Rollin' (1956)
**"I'm in the Mood for Love"**	Jimmy McHugh, Dorothy Fields	4 January 1957		m	Imperial 5428 (1957), Here Stands Fats Domino (1957)
**"I'm Living Right"**	Charles Singleton	2 May 1963		m	Here Comes... Fats Domino (mono) (1963)
**"I'm Living Right"**	Charles Singleton	2 May 1963		s	Here Comes... Fats Domino (stereo) (1963)
**"I'm Ready"**	Sylvester Bradford, Al Lewis, A. Domino	29 January 1959	Version 1	m-oh	Imperial 5585 (1959), Fats Domino Sings Million Record Hits (1960)
**"I'm Ready"**	Sylvester Bradford, Al Lewis, A. Domino	29 January 1959	Version 1	m	Out of New Orleans (1993)
**"I'm Ready"**	Sylvester Bradford, Al Lewis, A. Domino	May 1968	Version 2	s	Fats Is Back (1968)
**"I'm Walkin'"**	A. Domino, D. Bartholomew	3 January 1957		m-ed	Imperial 5428 (1957), Here Stands Fats Domino (1957)
**"I'm Walkin'"**	A. Domino, D. Bartholomew	3 January 1957		m	My Blue Heaven: The Best Vol. 1 (1990)
**"I'm Walkin'"**	A. Domino, D. Bartholomew	3 January 1957		m-oi (Note: Overdubbed in April 1992 for Aral commercial.)	The Originals, Vol. 10 (1995)
**"I've Been Around"**	A. Domino	26 September 1959		m	Imperial X5629 (1959), Fats Domino Sings Million Record Hits (1960)
**"I've Been Around"**	A. Domino	26 September 1959		s	"They Call Me The Fat Man..." (1991)
**"I've Been Calling"**	A. Domino, Jimmy Donley, Pee Wee Maddux	23 March 1961		m	What a Party! (1961)
**"I've Been Calling"**	A. Domino, Jimmy Donley, Pee Wee Maddux	23 March 1961		r	Out of New Orleans (1993)
**"I've Been Calling"**	A. Domino, Jimmy Donley, Pee Wee Maddux	23 March 1961		s	Walking to New Orleans (box) (2002)
"I've Got a Right to Cry"	→ "I Got a Right to Cry"				
**"I've Got Eyes for You"**	A. Domino	January 1951		m	Rare Dominos (1968)
**"Ida Jane"**	A. Domino	25 May 1956		m	Let's Play Fats Domino (1959)
**"Ida Jane"**	A. Domino	25 May 1956		m-ed	Imperial 5816 (1962)
**"If I Could"**		28 March 1961			Unreleased
**"If I Didn't Love You So"**		1 August 1983			Unreleased
**"If I Get Rich"**	A. Domino	May 1978	Master	s	Fats Domino 1980 (1980)
**"If I Get Rich"**	A. Domino	May 1978	Alternate	s	The Fat Man (1996)
**"If You Don't Know What Love Is"**	A. Domino	10 January 1964		m	ABC 45-10567 (1964), The Best of Fats Domino! (1966)
**"If You Don't Know What Love Is"**	A. Domino	10 January 1964		s	Stars of the Sixties (1973)
**"If You Need Me"** (Note: This song begins with the words: "If you need me, call my name".)	A. Domino, D. Bartholomew	27 October 1953	Song I, version 1	m	Fats Domino Rock and Rollin' (1956)
**"If You Need Me"**	A. Domino, D. Bartholomew	7 November 1955	Song I, version 2		Unreleased
**"If You Need Me"** (Note: This song begins with the words: "If you need me, please tell me so".)	A. Domino, D. Bartholomew	30 October 1958	Song II	m	Imperial X5645 (1960), Fats Domino Sings Million Record Hits (1960)
**"If You Need Me"**	A. Domino, D. Bartholomew	30 October 1958	Song II	s	Don't You Know? (1987)
**"In a Shanty in Old Shanty Town"**	Little Jack Little, Ira Schuster, Joe Young	20 June 1961		m	Let the Four Winds Blow (mono) (1961)
**"In a Shanty in Old Shanty Town"**	Little Jack Little, Ira Schuster, Joe Young	20 June 1961		s	Let the Four Winds Blow (stereo) (1961)
**"Isle of Capri"**	Wilhelm Grosz, Jimmy Kennedy	15 August 1958		m	I Miss You So (1961)
**"It Keeps Rainin'"**	A. Domino, D. Bartholomew, Robert Guidry	28 December 1960		m	Imperial X5753 (1961), I Miss You So (1961)
**"It Keeps Rainin'"**	A. Domino, D. Bartholomew, Robert Guidry	28 December 1960		s	"They Call Me The Fat Man..." (1991)
**"It Makes No Difference Now"**	Floyd Tillman	1 August 1983		s	Alive and Kickin' (2006)
**"It Must Be Love"**	A. Domino, D. Bartholomew	1 June 1957		m	Imperial X5537 (1958)
**"It's a Sin to Tell a Lie"**	Billy Mayhew	2–3 September 1967		s	Fats (1971)
**"It's Never Too Late"**	A. Domino, D. Bartholomew, E. Thompson, M. Sanchez	12 June 1965		m	Mercury 72485 (1965)
**"It's the Talk of the Town"**	Jerry Livingston, Al J. Neiburg, Marty Symes	6 August 1960		m	...A Lot of Dominos! (mono) (1960)
**"It's the Talk of the Town"**	Jerry Livingston, Al J. Neiburg, Marty Symes	6 August 1960		s	...A Lot of Dominos! (stereo) (1960)
**"It's You I Love"**	A. Domino, D. Bartholomew	11 April 1957		m-oc	Imperial 5442 (1957), This Is Fats (1957)
**"It's You I Love"**	A. Domino, D. Bartholomew	11 April 1957		m	"They Call Me The Fat Man..." (1991)
**"Jambalaya (On the Bayou)"**	Hank Williams	6 November 1961		m	Imperial 5796 (1961), Million Sellers by Fats (1962)
**"Jingle Bells"**	James Lord Pierpont	March 1992		s	Christmas Is a Special Day (1993)
"Just a Little While (To Stay Here)"	Not by Fats Domino				
**"Just a Lonely Man"**	A. Domino	23 April 1963		m	Here Comes... Fats Domino (mono) (1963), ABC 45-10512 (1963)
**"Just a Lonely Man"**	A. Domino	23 April 1963		s	Here Comes... Fats Domino (stereo) (1963)
**"Just Can't Get New Orleans** **(Off My Mind)"**	A. Domino	May 1978		s	Sleeping on the Job (1979)
**"Just Me and You"**		October 1961			Unreleased
**"Kansas City"**	Jerry Leiber, Mike Stoller	8 October 1964		m	ABC 45-10596 (1964), Getaway with Fats Domino (mono) (1965)
**"Kansas City"**	Jerry Leiber, Mike Stoller	8 October 1964		s	Getaway with Fats Domino (stereo) (1965)
**"Korea Blues"**	D. Bartholomew, Al Young	September 1950		m	Imperial 5099 (1950)
"La La"	→ "La-La"				
**"La-La"**	A. Domino, D. Bartholomew	30 March 1955	Version 1	m	Imperial 5348 (1955), This Is Fats Domino! (1956)
**"La-La"**	A. Domino, D. Bartholomew	23 or 30 April 1960	Version 2	m-ed	Just Domino (1962)
**"La-La"**	A. Domino, D. Bartholomew	23 or 30 April 1960	Version 2	s	"They Call Me The Fat Man..." (1991)
**"La-La"**	A. Domino, D. Bartholomew	23 or 30 April 1960	Version 2	s-ed-os	I've Been Around (2019)
**"Lady Madonna"**	John Lennon, Paul McCartney	May 1968		m	Reprise 0763 (1968)
**"Lady Madonna"**	John Lennon, Paul McCartney	May 1968		s	Fats Is Back (1968)
**"Land of 1,000 Dances"**	Chris Kenner	2 May 1963		m	Here Comes... Fats Domino (mono) (1963)
**"Land of 1,000 Dances"**	Chris Kenner	2 May 1963		s	Here Comes... Fats Domino (stereo) (1963)
**"Lawdy Miss Clawdy"**	Lloyd Price	13 September 1967		s	Fats (1971)
**"Lazy Lady"**	A. Domino, Reginald Hall	13 January 1964		m	ABC 45-10531 (1964), The Best of Fats Domino! (1966)
**"Lazy Lady"**	A. Domino, Reginald Hall	13 January 1964		s	Stars of the Sixties (1973)
**"Lazy Woman"**	A. Domino, D. Bartholomew	25 July 1958		m	Walking to New Orleans (1963)
**"Let Me Call You Sweetheart"**	Arranged by A. Domino	15 February 1965		m	ABC 45-10644 (1965), The Best of Fats Domino! (1966)
**"Let Me Call You Sweetheart"**	Arranged by A. Domino	15 February 1965		s	The Best! (1979)
**"Let the Four Winds Blow"**	A. Domino, D. Bartholomew	20 June 1961, session 1	Version 1	s-ed	The Originals, Vol. 4 (1992)
**"Let the Four Winds Blow"**	A. Domino, D. Bartholomew	20 June 1961, session 1	Version 1	r	Out of New Orleans (1993)
**"Let the Four Winds Blow"**	A. Domino, D. Bartholomew	20 June 1961, session 2	Version 2, master take	m-ed	Let the Four Winds Blow (mono) (1961), Imperial X5764 (1961)
**"Let the Four Winds Blow"**	A. Domino, D. Bartholomew	20 June 1961, session 2	Version 2, master take	s-ed	Let the Four Winds Blow (stereo) (1961)
**"Let the Four Winds Blow"**	A. Domino, D. Bartholomew	20 June 1961, session 2	Version 2, master take	r	My Blue Heaven: The Best Vol. 1 (1990)
**"Let the Four Winds Blow"**	A. Domino, D. Bartholomew	20 June 1961, session 2	Version 2, master take	s	Walking to New Orleans (box) (2002)
**"Let the Four Winds Blow"**	A. Domino, D. Bartholomew	20 June 1961, session 2	Version 2, take 9	s	Out of New Orleans (1993)
**"Li'l Liza Jane"**	Countess Ada de Lachau, A. Domino, D. Bartholomew	4 November 1958		m	Let's Play Fats Domino (1959)
**"Li'l Liza Jane"**	Countess Ada de Lachau, A. Domino, D. Bartholomew	4 November 1958		m-oc	Here He Comes Again! (1963)
**"Li'l Liza Jane"**	Countess Ada de Lachau, A. Domino, D. Bartholomew	4 November 1958		s	"They Call Me The Fat Man..." (1991)
**"Little Bee"**	D. Bartholomew	7 January 1950		m	Imperial 5065 (1950), Here Stands Fats Domino (1957)
**"Little Mama"**	A. Domino, D. Bartholomew	10 July 1954		m	Walking to New Orleans (1963)
**"Little Mary"**	A. Domino, D. Bartholomew	13 June 1957		m	Imperial X5526 (1958), The Fabulous "Mr. D" (1958)
**"Little School Girl"**	A. Domino, D. Bartholomew	27 October 1953		m	Imperial 5272 (1954), Fats Domino Rock and Rollin' (1956) (Note: Titled "Are You Going My Way".)
**"Long Lonesome Journey"**	A. Domino, Ted Jarrett	26 April 1952		m	The Fabulous "Mr. D" (1958)
**"Love Me"**	A. Domino, D. Bartholomew	13 August 1954	Song I	m	Imperial 5313 (1954), This Is Fats (1957)
**"Love Me"**	Jerry Leiber, Mike Stoller	13 January 1964	Song II	m	Fats on Fire (mono) (1964)
**"Love Me"**	Jerry Leiber, Mike Stoller	13 January 1964	Song II	s	Fats on Fire (stereo) (1964)
**"Love Me"**	A. Domino, Reginald Hall	May 1978	Song III	s	Sleeping on the Job (1979)
**"Love You Till the Day I Die"**	A. Domino, R. Pauly	January 2000		s	Alive and Kickin' (2006)
**"Lovely Rita"**	John Lennon, Paul McCartney	May 1968		m	Reprise 0775 (1968)
**"Lovely Rita"**	John Lennon, Paul McCartney	May 1968		s	Fats Is Back (1968)
**"Magic Isles"**	A. Domino, D. Bartholomew	6 August 1960		m	...A Lot of Dominos! (mono) (1960)
**"Magic Isles"**	A. Domino, D. Bartholomew	6 August 1960		s	...A Lot of Dominos! (stereo) (1960)
**"Make Me Belong to You"**	Chip Taylor, Billy Vera	May 1968		s	Fats Is Back (1968)
**"Make Me Belong to You"**	Chip Taylor, Billy Vera	May 1968		m-ed	Reprise 0891 (1970)
**"Man That's All"**	A. Domino, D. Bartholomew	7 January 1965	Version 1	m	Getaway with Fats Domino (mono) (1965)
**"Man That's All"**	A. Domino, D. Bartholomew	7 January 1965	Version 1	s	Getaway with Fats Domino (stereo) (1965)
**"Man That's All"**	A. Domino, D. Bartholomew	13 September 1967	Version 2 (Note: Titled "Another Mule" and credited to Fats Domino as sole songwriter.)	s	Fats (1971)
**"Mardi Gras in New Orleans"**	Henry Roeland Byrd	10 September 1952		m	Imperial 5231 (1953), The Fabulous "Mr. D" (1958)
**"Margie"**	Con Conrad, J. Russel Robinson, Benny Davis	23 September 1958	Version 1	m	The Originals, Vol. 5 (1992)
**"Margie"**	Con Conrad, J. Russel Robinson, Benny Davis	30 October 1958	Version 2, take 9	m	I've Been Around (2019)
**"Margie"**	Con Conrad, J. Russel Robinson, Benny Davis	30 October 1958	Version 2, take 10: master	m	Imperial 5585 (1959), Let's Play Fats Domino (1959)
**"Margie"**	Con Conrad, J. Russel Robinson, Benny Davis	30 October 1958	Version 2, take 10: master	s	"They Call Me The Fat Man..." (1991)
**"Mary, Oh Mary"**	A. Domino	10 January 1964		m	Fats on Fire (mono) (1964), ABC 45-10567 (1964)
**"Mary, Oh Mary"**	A. Domino	10 January 1964		s	Fats on Fire (stereo) (1964)
**"Matter of Time"**		1 August 1983		s	Give Me Some! (2009)
**"Monkey Business"**	A. Domino, D. Bartholomew	8 September 1964		m	Getaway with Fats Domino (mono) (1965)
**"Monkey Business"**	A. Domino, D. Bartholomew	8 September 1964		s	Getaway with Fats Domino (stereo) (1965)
**"Move with the Groove"** (instr.)	A. Domino	May 1978		s	Sleeping on the Job (1979)
**"My Bleeding Heart"**	A. Domino, D. Bartholomew	4 November 1958	Master	m	I Miss You So (1961), Imperial 5833 (1962) (Note: Titled "My Heart Is Bleeding".)
**"My Bleeding Heart"**	A. Domino, D. Bartholomew	4 November 1958	Alternate	s	Out of New Orleans (1993)
**"My Baby's Gone"**	A. Domino	February 1951		m	Rare Dominos (1968)
**"My Blue Heaven"**	Walter Donaldson, George A. Whiting	23 December 1955		m	Imperial 5386 (1956), Fats Domino Rock and Rollin' (1956)
**"My Blue Heaven"**	Walter Donaldson, George A. Whiting	23 December 1955	Film version	m-ed	The Originals, Vol. 11 (1995)
**"My Girl Josephine"**	A. Domino	July 1960		m	Imperial X5704 (1960),...A Lot of Dominos! (mono) (1960)
**"My Girl Josephine"**	A. Domino	July 1960		s	...A Lot of Dominos! (stereo) (1960)
**"My Happiness"**	Borney Bergantine, Betty Peterson Blasco	4 January 1957		m	This Is Fats (1957)
"My Heart Is Bleeding"	→ "My Bleeding Heart"				
"My Heart Is in Your Hands"	→ "Something's Wrong"				
**"My Love for Her"**	A. Domino, D. Bartholomew	3 August 1957		m	Walking to New Orleans (1963)
**"My Old Friends"**	Pasquale Zompa, Bernard DeCesare	May 1968		s	Fats Is Back (1968)
**"My Old Time Use to Be"**	A. Domino, William Boskent	May 1978		s	Fats Domino 1980 (1980)
**"My Real Name"**	A. Domino	5 January 1962		m	Imperial 5833 (1962), Million Sellers by Fats (1962)
**"My Real Name"**	A. Domino	5 January 1962		s	"They Call Me The Fat Man..." (1991)
**"My Toot Toot"** (with Doug Kershaw) (Note: Same duo vocal/piano track is overdubbed by two different backing instrumental tracks for obtain two versions of song.)	Terrance Simien	30 April 1985	Country	s	Toot Toot TT 001 (1985)
**"My Toot Toot"** (with Doug Kershaw)	Terrance Simien	30 April 1985	Rock	s	Toot Toot TT 001 (1985)
**"Natural Born Lover"**	A. Domino, D. Bartholomew	6 August 1960		m-ed1	Imperial X5704 (1960)
**"Natural Born Lover"**	A. Domino, D. Bartholomew	6 August 1960		m-ed2	...A Lot of Dominos! (mono) (1960)
**"Natural Born Lover"**	A. Domino, D. Bartholomew	6 August 1960		s	...A Lot of Dominos! (stereo) (1960)
"New Baby"	→ "Brand New Baby"				
**"New Orleans Ain't the Same"**	A. Domino, C. Arnold, M. Tynes	3 July 1970		m	Reprise 0944 (1970)
"No No"	→ "No, No"				
"No No (The River)"	→ "No, No"				
**"No, No"**	A. Domino, D. Bartholomew	4 February 1958		m	Imperial 5515 (1958), Just Domino (1962)
"No, No (The River)"	→ "No, No"				
**"No, No Baby"**	A. Domino, Al Young	June 1951		m	Imperial 5138 (1951)
**"Nobody Loves Me"**	A. Domino	10 September 1952		m	Imperial 5220 (1953)
**"Nobody Needs You Like Me"**	A. Domino, D. Bartholomew	21 April 1963		m	The Best of Fats Domino! (1966)
**"Nothing New (Same Old Thing)"**	A. Domino, D. Bartholomew, Jack Jessup, Pee Wee Maddux	14 April 1962	Take 4	m	Imperial 5863 (1962), Just Domino (1962)
**"Nothing New (Same Old Thing)"**	A. Domino, D. Bartholomew, Jack Jessup, Pee Wee Maddux	14 April 1962	Take 4	s	Out of New Orleans (1993)
**"Oh Ba-a-by"**	A. Domino, D. Bartholomew	15 March 1955		m	Let's Dance with Domino (1963)
**"Oh Ba-a-by"**	A. Domino, D. Bartholomew	15 March 1955		m-oc	Here He Comes Again! (1963)
"Oh Baby"	→ "Oh Ba-a-by"				
**"Oh Wee"**	A. Domino, D. Bartholomew	3 August 1957		m	Walking to New Orleans (1963)
"Oh Whee"	→ "Oh Wee"				
**"Old Man Trouble"**	J. D. Smith	10 January 1964		m	Fats on Fire (mono) (1964)
**"Old Man Trouble"**	J. D. Smith	10 January 1964		s	Fats on Fire (stereo) (1964)
"On a Slow Boat to China"	→ "On a Slow Boat to China"				
**"Once in a While"**	Michael Edwards, Bud Green	15 August 1958		m	I Miss You So (1961)
**"One for the Highway"**	A. Domino	May 1968		m	Reprise 0696 (1968)
**"One for the Highway"**	A. Domino	May 1968		s	Fats Is Back (1968)
**"One More Song for You"**	Pasquale Zompa, Bernard DeCesare	May 1968		s	Fats Is Back (1968)
**"One Night"**	D. Bartholomew, Pearl King	28 March 1961	Version 1		Unreleased
**"One Night"**	D. Bartholomew, Pearl King	20 June 1961	Version 2	m	Let the Four Winds Blow (mono) (1961), Imperial 5980 (1963)
**"One Night"**	D. Bartholomew, Pearl King	20 June 1961	Version 2	s	Let the Four Winds Blow (stereo) (1961)
**"One of These Days"**	A. Domino, D. Bartholomew	17 April 1958		m	Walking to New Orleans (1963)
**"One Step at a Time"**	A. Domino	January 2000		s	Alive and Kickin' (2006)
**"Packin' Up"**	Chris Kenner	13 January 1964		m	ABC 45-10567 (1964), The Best of Fats Domino! (1966)
**"Packin' Up"**	Chris Kenner	13 January 1964		s	Stars of the Sixties (1973)
**"Please Come Home for Christmas** **(Christmas Once Again)"**	Charles Brown, Gene Redd	March 1992		s	Christmas Is a Special Day (1993)
**"Please Don't Leave Me"**	A. Domino	18 April 1953		m	Imperial 5240 (1953), Rock and Rollin' with Fats Domino (1956)
**"Poor Me"**	A. Domino, D. Bartholomew	23 September 1955		m	Imperial 5369 (1955), Rock and Rollin' with Fats Domino (1956)
**"Poor Poor Me"**	A. Domino	26 April 1952		m	Imperial 5197 (1952), This Is Fats Domino! (1956)
**"Prisoner's Song"**	Guy Massey	17 April 1958		m	Imperial X5526 (1958)
**"Put Your Arms Around Me Honey"**	Albert Von Tilzer, Junie McCree	July 1960		m-ed	Imperial X5687 (1960),...A Lot of Dominos! (mono) (1960)
**"Put Your Arms Around Me Honey"**	Albert Von Tilzer, Junie McCree	July 1960		s-ed	...A Lot of Dominos! (stereo) (1960)
**"Put Your Arms Around Me Honey"**	Albert Von Tilzer, Junie McCree	July 1960		s	Walking to New Orleans (box) (2002)
**"Red Sails in the Sunset"**	Hugh Williams, Jimmy Kennedy	1 May 1963		m	Here Comes... Fats Domino (mono) (1963), ABC 45-10484 (1963)
**"Red Sails in the Sunset"**	Hugh Williams, Jimmy Kennedy	1 May 1963		s	Here Comes... Fats Domino (stereo) (1963)
"Reelin' and Rockin'"	→ "Reeling and Rocking"				
**"Reeling and Rocking"**	A. Domino, Al Young	November 1951 or January 1952	Version 1	m	Imperial 45-5180 (1952), This Is Fats Domino! (1956)
**"Reeling and Rocking"**	A. Domino, Al Young	7 January 1965	Version 2 (Note: Titled "Reelin' and Rockin'".)	m	Getaway with Fats Domino (mono) (1965)
**"Reeling and Rocking"**	A. Domino, Al Young	7 January 1965	Version 2	s	Getaway with Fats Domino (stereo) (1965)
**"Right from Wrong"**	A. Domino, Al Young	June 1951		m	Imperial 5138 (1951)
**"Rising Sun"**	A. Domino	July 1960		m	...A Lot of Dominos! (mono) (1960)
**"Rising Sun"**	A. Domino	July 1960		s	...A Lot of Dominos! (stereo) (1960)
**"Rockin' Bicycle"**	A. Domino, Jack Jessup, Pee Wee Maddux	11 September 1961		m	Imperial 5779 (1961), What a Party! (1961)
**"Rockin' Bicycle"**	A. Domino, Jack Jessup, Pee Wee Maddux	11 September 1961		s	Out of New Orleans (1993)
**"Rockin' Chair"**	A. Domino, Al Young	February 1951		m	Imperial 5145 (1951)
"Rosalie"	→ "I Can't Go On"				
**"Rose Mary"**	A. Domino, D. Bartholomew	18 April 1953	Version 1	m	Rare Dominos (1968)
**"Rose Mary"**	A. Domino, D. Bartholomew	1 June 1953	Version 2: master	m	Imperial 5251 (1953), Rock and Rollin' with Fats Domino (1956)
**"Rudolph the Red-Nosed Reindeer"**	Johnny Marks	March 1992		s	Christmas Is a Special Day (1993)
**"Sailor Boy"**	A. Domino, D. Bartholomew	1 June 1957		m	Walking to New Orleans (1963)
**"Sally Was a Good Old Girl"**	Harlan Howard	24 June 1964		m	ABC 45-10584 (1964), The Best of Fats Domino! (1966)
**"Sally Was a Good Old Girl"**	Harlan Howard	24 June 1964		s	The Best! (1979)
**"Second Line Jump"** (instr.)	A. Domino, D. Bartholomew	December 1952 or January 1953		m	Fats Domino Rock and Rollin' (1956)
"Set Me Free"	→ "Don't Know What's Wrong"				
**"Shame on You"**	A. Domino, Reginald Hall	May 1978		s	Sleeping on the Job (1979)
**"She's My Baby"**	A. Domino, D. Bartholomew	10 December 1949		m	Imperial 5077 (1950), Here Stands Fats Domino (1957)
"Shu Rah"	→ "Shurah"				
**"Shurah"**	A. Domino, D. Bartholomew	July 1960		m-ed	...A Lot of Dominos! (mono) (1960), Imperial X5734 (1961) (Note: Titled "Shu Rah".)
**"Shurah"**	A. Domino, D. Bartholomew	July 1960		s-ed	...A Lot of Dominos! (stereo) (1960)
**"Shurah"**	A. Domino, D. Bartholomew	July 1960		s	Walking to New Orleans (box) (2002)
**"Sick and Tired"**	A. Domino, D. Bartholomew, Chris Kenner	4 February 1958		m	Imperial 5515 (1958), The Fabulous "Mr. D" (1958)
**"Silent Night"**	Gruber, Mohr	March 1992		s	Christmas Is a Special Day (1993)
**"Silver Bells"**	Livingston, Evans	March 1992		s	Christmas Is a Special Day (1993)
**"Sleeping on the Job"**	A. Domino, William Boskent	May 1978		s	Sonet (GB) SON 2168 (1978)
**"On a Slow Boat to China"**	Frank Loesser	7 January 1965		m	Getaway with Fats Domino (mono) (1965)
**"On a Slow Boat to China"**	Frank Loesser	7 January 1965		s	Getaway with Fats Domino (stereo) (1965)
**"So Glad"**	A. Domino, D. Bartholomew	30 October 1958		m	Walking to New Orleans (1963)
**"So Glad"**	A. Domino, D. Bartholomew	30 October 1958		s	Out of New Orleans (1993)
**"So Long"**	A. Domino, D. Bartholomew	30 November 1955		m	Imperial 5396 (1956), This Is Fats Domino! (1956)
**"So Swell When You're Well"**	James Booker	May 1968		m	Reprise 0810 (1969)
**"So Swell When You're Well"**	James Booker	May 1968		s	Fats Is Back (1968)
"Someday"	Not by Fats Domino				
**"Something About You Baby"**	A. Domino, Reginald Hall	May 1978		s	Sleeping on the Job (1979)
**"Something You Got Baby"**	Chris Kenner	9 January 1964		m	ABC 45-10545 (1964), The Best of Fats Domino! (1966)
**"Something You Got Baby"**	Chris Kenner	9 January 1964		s	Stars of the Sixties (1973)
**"Something's Wrong"**	A. Domino, D. Bartholomew	2 September 1953		m	Imperial 5262 (1953), Fats Domino Rock and Rollin' (1956) (Note: Titled "My Heart Is in Your Hands".)
**"Sometimes I Wonder"**	A. Domino, Al Young	February 1951		m	Imperial 5123 (1951)
**"Song for Rosemary"** (instr.)	A. Domino	1 May 1963		m	Here Comes... Fats Domino (mono) (1963), ABC 45-10484 (1963)
**"Song for Rosemary"** (instr.)	A. Domino	1 May 1963		s	Here Comes... Fats Domino (stereo) (1963)
**"South of the Border"**	Michael Carr, Jimmy Kennedy	6 November 1961		m	Twistin' the Stomp (1962)
**"South of the Border"**	Michael Carr, Jimmy Kennedy	6 November 1961		m-oc	Here He Comes Again! (1963)
**"St. Louis Blues"**		12 June 1965			Unreleased
**"Stack & Billy"**	A. Domino, D. Bartholomew	13 June 1957	Take 5	m	Let's Play Fats Domino (1959)
**"Stay Away"**	A. Domino	January 1951		m	Rare Dominos (1968)
**"Stop the Clock"**	A. Domino, Kenny James, Pee Wee Maddux	5 January 1962		m-ed	Just Domino (1962)
**"Stop the Clock"**	A. Domino, Kenny James, Pee Wee Maddux	5 January 1962		s	"They Call Me The Fat Man..." (1991)
**"Swanee River Hop"** (instr.)	Traditional arranged by A. Domino, D. Bartholomew	February 1953		m	Fats Domino Rock and Rollin' (1956)
**"Sweet Patootie"**	Fred Smith, C. Cronander	3 July 1970		m	Reprise 0944 (1970)
**"Teen Age Love"**	A. Domino, Pearl King	5 January 1962		m-ed	Just Domino (1962)
**"Teen Age Love"**	A. Domino, Pearl King	5 January 1962		s	Out of New Orleans (1993)
"Teenage Love"	→ "Teen Age Love"				
**"Tell Me That You Love Me"**	A. Domino, D. Bartholomew	10 February 1960		m	Imperial X5660 (1960), What a Party! (1961)
**"Tell Me the Truth, Baby"**	A. Domino	1 May 1963		m	Here Comes... Fats Domino (mono) (1963)
**"Tell Me the Truth, Baby"**	A. Domino	1 May 1963		s	Here Comes... Fats Domino (stereo) (1963)
**"Telling Lies"**	A. Domino, Earl Palmer	25 January 1957		m	Imperial 5569 (1959), Let's Dance with Domino (1963)
**"Telling Lies"**	A. Domino, Earl Palmer	25 January 1957		m-oc	Here He Comes Again! (1963)
**"That Certain Someone"**	A. Domino, D. Bartholomew	25 June 1964		m	The Best of Fats Domino! (1966)
**"The Big Beat"**	A. Domino, D. Bartholomew	5 June 1957		m	Imperial 5477 (1957), The Fabulous "Mr. D" (1958)
**"The Fat Man"**	A. Domino, D. Bartholomew	10 December 1949	Version 1	m	Imperial 5058 (1950), Rock and Rollin' with Fats Domino (1956)
**"The Fat Man"**	A. Domino, D. Bartholomew	11 January 1964	Version 2	m	Fats on Fire (mono) (1964)
**"The Fat Man"**	A. Domino, D. Bartholomew	11 January 1964	Version 2	s	Fats on Fire (stereo) (1964)
**"The Fat Man's Hop"** (instr.)	A. Domino, Al Young	November 1951 or January 1952		m	This Is Fats Domino! (1956)
**"The Girl I Love"**	A. Domino, D. Bartholomew	1 June 1953	Version 1	m	Imperial 5240 (1953), Twistin' the Stomp (1962)
**"The Girl I Love"**	A. Domino, D. Bartholomew	May 1978	Version 2	s	Sleeping on the Job (1979)
**"The Girl I'm Gonna Marry"**	A. Domino, A. Downing	8 September 1964		m	Getaway with Fats Domino (mono) (1965)
**"The Girl I'm Gonna Marry"**	A. Domino, A. Downing	8 September 1964		s	Getaway with Fats Domino (stereo) (1965)
**"The Lady in Black"**	A. Domino, D. Bartholomew	2–3 September 1967		m	Broadmoor 104 (1967)
**"The Lady in Black"**	A. Domino, D. Bartholomew	2–3 September 1967		s	Fats (1971)
**"The Land of Make-Believe"**	R. Nelson, U. Ray, D. Alex	9 January 1964		m	Fats on Fire (mono) (1964)
**"The Land of Make-Believe"**	R. Nelson, U. Ray, D. Alex	9 January 1964		s	Fats on Fire (stereo) (1964)
**"The Rooster Song"**	A. Domino, D. Bartholomew	25 January 1957		m	This Is Fats (1957)
**"The Sheik of Araby"**	Ted Snyder, Harry B. Smith, Francis Wheeler	15 August 1958	Version 1	m	...A Lot of Dominos! (mono) (1960)
**"The Sheik of Araby"**	Ted Snyder, Harry B. Smith, Francis Wheeler	30 October 1958	Version 2, take 6	s	...A Lot of Dominos! (stereo) (1960)
**"The Sheik of Araby"**	Ted Snyder, Harry B. Smith, Francis Wheeler	30 October 1958	Version 2, take 6	m	Don't You Know? (1987)
"The Twist Set Me Free"	→ "Don't Know What's Wrong"				
**"There Goes My Heart Again"**	A. Domino	21 April 1963		m	ABC 45-10444 (1963), Here Comes... Fats Domino (mono) (1963)
**"There Goes My Heart Again"**	A. Domino	21 April 1963		s	Here Comes... Fats Domino (stereo) (1963)
**"There You Go"**		1 August 1983		s	Give Me Some! (2009)
**"These Old Shoes"**	A. Domino, D. Bartholomew	2–3 September 1967		s	Fats (1971)
**"Thinking of You"**	Reginald Hall	14 December 1953		m	Imperial X5323 (1954), This Is Fats (1957)
**"This Is My Story"**	A. Domino	January 2000	Master	s	Alive and Kickin' (2006)
**"This Is My Story"**	A. Domino	January 2000	Alternate	s	Give Me Some! (2009)
**"Those Eyes"**	D. Bartholomew, Robert Guidry	14 April 1962	Take 6	m-ed	Just Domino (1962), Imperial 5909 (1963)
**"Those Eyes"**	D. Bartholomew, Robert Guidry	14 April 1962	Take 6	s	Out of New Orleans (1993)
**"Three Fools"**		1 August 1983		s	Give Me Some! (2009)
**"Three Fools"**		1 August 1983		s-od	Give Me Some! (2009)
**"Three Nights a Week"**	A. Domino	July 1960		m	Imperial X5687 (1960),...A Lot of Dominos! (mono) (1960)
**"Three Nights a Week"**	A. Domino	July 1960		s	...A Lot of Dominos! (stereo) (1960)
**"Tired of Crying"**	A. Domino	January 1951	Master	m	Imperial 5114 (1951), Rock and Rollin' with Fats Domino (1956)
**"Tired of Crying"**	A. Domino	January 1951	Alternate	m	Out of New Orleans (1993)
**"Town Talk"** (instr.)	A. Domino, D. Bartholomew	20 February 1957		m	Twistin' the Stomp (1962)
**"Trouble Blues"**	Charles Brown	20 June 1961		m	Let the Four Winds Blow (mono) (1961)
**"Trouble Blues"**	Charles Brown	20 June 1961		s	Let the Four Winds Blow (stereo) (1961)
**"Trouble in Mind"**	Richard M. Jones	23 March 1961	Version 1	m	What a Party! (1961)
**"Trouble in Mind"**	Richard M. Jones	23 March 1961	Version 1	m-oc	Here He Comes Again! (1963)
**"Trouble in Mind"**	Richard M. Jones	8 September 1964	Version 2	m	Getaway with Fats Domino (mono) (1965)
**"Trouble in Mind"**	Richard M. Jones	8 September 1964	Version 2	s	Getaway with Fats Domino (stereo) (1965)
**"Troubles of My Own"**	A. Domino, D. Bartholomew	May 1955		m	Imperial 5357 (1955), This Is Fats Domino! (1956)
**"True Confession"**	A. Domino, D. Bartholomew	11 April 1957	Version 1	m	Let's Dance with Domino (1963), Imperial 5959 (1963)
**"True Confession"**	A. Domino, D. Bartholomew	October 1961	Version 2		Unreleased
**"Trust in Me"**	A. Domino, Ted Jarrett	26 April 1952		m (Note: Some compilations include so-called "extended version" of this recording. But it seems that "extension" (circa 15 seconds) was obtained artificially by repetition of instrumental ending.)	Imperial 5197 (1952), This Is Fats Domino! (1956)
**"Twistin' the Spots"** (instr.)	A. Domino, D. Bartholomew	20 February 1957		m	Twistin' the Stomp (1962)
"Twistin' the Stomp"	→ "Domino Stomp"				
**"Valley of Tears"**	A. Domino, D. Bartholomew	11 April 1957	Version 1, take 11	m-oc	Imperial 5442 (1957), This Is Fats (1957)
**"Valley of Tears"**	A. Domino, D. Bartholomew	11 April 1957	Version 1, take 11	m	My Blue Heaven: The Best Vol. 1 (1990)
**"Valley of Tears"**	A. Domino, D. Bartholomew	13 January 1964	Version 2	m	Fats on Fire (mono) (1964)
**"Valley of Tears"**	A. Domino, D. Bartholomew	13 January 1964	Version 2	s	Fats on Fire (stereo) (1964)
"Wait 'Til It Happens to You"	→ "Wait Till It Happens to You"				
**"Wait and See"**	A. Domino, D. Bartholomew	11 April 1957		m	Imperial X5467 (1957), Twistin' the Stomp (1962)
**"Wait Till It Happens to You"**	A. Domino, D. Bartholomew	2–3 September 1967	Version 1	m	Broadmoor 105 (1968)
**"Wait Till It Happens to You"**	A. Domino, D. Bartholomew	2–3 September 1967	Version 1	s	Fats (1971)
**"Wait Till It Happens to You"**	A. Domino, D. Bartholomew	May 1968	Version 2	m	Reprise 0775 (1968)
**"Wait Till It Happens to You"**	A. Domino, D. Bartholomew	May 1968	Version 2	s	Fats Is Back (1968)
**"Walking to New Orleans"**	A. Domino, D. Bartholomew, Robert Guidry	23 or 30 April 1960		m-os	Imperial 5675 (1960),...A Lot of Dominos! (mono) (1960)
**"Walking to New Orleans"**	A. Domino, D. Bartholomew, Robert Guidry	23 or 30 April 1960		s-os	...A Lot of Dominos! (stereo) (1960)
**"Walking to New Orleans"**	A. Domino, D. Bartholomew, Robert Guidry	23 or 30 April 1960		r	Out of New Orleans (1993)
**"Walking to New Orleans"**	A. Domino, D. Bartholomew, Robert Guidry	23 or 30 April 1960		s	The Originals, Vol. 10 (1995)
**"What a Party"**	A. Domino, D. Bartholomew, Pearl King	11 September 1961		m-ed	Imperial 5779 (1961), What a Party! (1961)
**"What a Party"**	A. Domino, D. Bartholomew, Pearl King	11 September 1961		s-ed	"They Call Me The Fat Man..." (1991)
**"What a Party"**	A. Domino, D. Bartholomew, Pearl King	11 September 1961		s	Out of New Orleans (1993)
**"What a Price"**	A. Domino, Jack Jessup, Pee Wee Maddux	28 December 1960		m	Imperial 5723 (1961), I Miss You So (1961)
**"What a Price"**	A. Domino, Jack Jessup, Pee Wee Maddux	28 December 1960		s	"They Call Me The Fat Man..." (1991)
**"What Will I Tell My Heart"**	Jack Lawrence, Peter Tinturin	3 January 1957		m	Imperial 5454 (1957), The Fabulous "Mr. D" (1958)
**"What's That You Got?"**	D. Bartholomew	12 June 1965		m	Mercury 72485 (1965)
**"What's the Matter Baby"**	A. Domino	January 1951		m	Imperial 5114 (1951)
**"What's the Reason I'm Not Pleasing You"**	Jimmie Grier, Earl Hatch, Coy Poe, Pinky Tomlin	21 June 1956		m	Imperial 5417 (1956), This Is Fats Domino! (1956)
**"What's Wrong"**	A. Domino, Pearl King	23 September 1955		m	Walking to New Orleans (1963)
"When I Lost My Baby" (Note: Title mistakenly used for "I Almost Lost My Mind" in album Sleeping on the Job and in its version Fats Domino 1980.)	→ "After Hours / I Almost Lost My Mind"				
**"When I See You"**	A. Domino, D. Bartholomew	13 June 1957		m	Imperial 5454 (1957), Let's Dance with Domino (1963)
**"When I See You"**	A. Domino, D. Bartholomew	13 June 1957		m-oc	Here He Comes Again! (1963)
**"When I Was Young"**	A. Domino, D. Bartholomew	18 June 1959	Master	m	I Miss You So (1961), Imperial 66016 (1964)
**"When I Was Young"**	A. Domino, D. Bartholomew	18 June 1959	Take 7	s	Out of New Orleans (1993)
**"When I'm Walking (Let Me Walk)"**	A. Domino	23 April 1963		m	ABC 45-10475 (1963), Here Comes... Fats Domino (mono) (1963)
**"When I'm Walking (Let Me Walk)"**	A. Domino	23 April 1963		s	Here Comes... Fats Domino (stereo) (1963)
**"When My Dreamboat Comes Home"**	Dave Franklin, Cliff Friend	25 May 1956	Version 1	m	Imperial 5396 (1956), Fats Domino Rock and Rollin' (1956)
**"When My Dreamboat Comes Home"**	Dave Franklin, Cliff Friend	7 January 1965	Version 2	m	Getaway with Fats Domino (mono) (1965)
**"When My Dreamboat Comes Home"**	Dave Franklin, Cliff Friend	7 January 1965	Version 2	s	Getaway with Fats Domino (stereo) (1965)
**"When the Saints Go Marching In"**	Unknown, arranged by A. Domino, D. Bartholomew	4 November 1958		m	Imperial 5569 (1959), Let's Play Fats Domino (1959)
**"When the Saints Go Marching In"**	Unknown, arranged by A. Domino, D. Bartholomew	4 November 1958		s	"They Call Me The Fat Man..." (1991)
**"When You're Smiling"**	Mark Fisher, Joe Goodwin, Larry Shay	1960 or 1961	Version 1	m	Not by Fats Domino
**"When You're Smiling"**	Mark Fisher, Joe Goodwin, Larry Shay	2–3 September 1967	Version 2	s	Fats (1971)
**"Where Did You Stay"**	A. Domino, D. Bartholomew	14 March 1954		m	Imperial 5283 (1954), This Is Fats (1957)
**"Wishing Ring"**	Al Britt, Pee Wee Maddux	6 November 1961		m	Just Domino (1962)
**"Wishing Ring"**	Al Britt, Pee Wee Maddux	6 November 1961		s	Out of New Orleans (1993)
**"Whiskey Heaven"**	Cliff Crofford, John Durrill, Snuff Garrett	30 June 1980		s	Any Which Way You Can (1980)
**"Whispering Wind"**		October 1961			Unreleased
**"White Christmas"**	Gruber, Mohr	March 1992		s	Christmas Is a Special Day (1993)
**"Who Cares"**	Don Gibson	2 May 1963	Master	m	ABC 45-10512 (1963), The Best of Fats Domino! (1966)
**"Who Cares"**	Don Gibson	2 May 1963	Alternate	m	The Fat Man (1996)
**"Whole Lotta Loving"**	A. Domino, D. Bartholomew	23 September 1958		m	Imperial 5553 (1958), Fats Domino Swings (12,000,000 Records) (1958)
**"Why Don't You Do Right?"**	Kansas Joe McCoy	7 January 1965		m	Getaway with Fats Domino (mono) (1965), ABC 45-10631 (1965)
**"Why Don't You Do Right?"**	Kansas Joe McCoy	7 January 1965		s	Getaway with Fats Domino (stereo) (1965)
**"Wigs"**	A. Domino, Reginald Hall	7 January 1965		m	Getaway with Fats Domino (mono) (1965), ABC 45-10631 (1965)
**"Wigs"**	A. Domino, Reginald Hall	7 January 1965		s	Getaway with Fats Domino (stereo) (1965)
**"Won't You Come on Back"**	Marion Carpenter, Tim Gillis, A. Domino	6 June 1961		m-ed	Let the Four Winds Blow (mono) (1961), Imperial 5895 (1962)
**"Won't You Come on Back"**	Marion Carpenter, Tim Gillis, A. Domino	6 June 1961		s-ed	Let the Four Winds Blow (stereo) (1961)
**"Won't You Come on Back"**	Marion Carpenter, Tim Gillis, A. Domino	6 June 1961		r	Out of New Orleans (1993)
**"Won't You Come on Back"**	Marion Carpenter, Tim Gillis, A. Domino	6 June 1961		s	Walking to New Orleans (box) (2002)
**"Work My Way up Steady"**	A. Domino, D. Bartholomew	2–3 September 1967		m	Broadmoor 104 (1967)
**"Work My Way up Steady"**	A. Domino, D. Bartholomew	2–3 September 1967		s	Fats (1971)
**"Would You"**	Victor Augustine, Pearl King, A. Domino	4 January 1957		m	Let's Play Fats Domino (1959)
**"Yes, My Darling"**	A. Domino, D. Bartholomew	28 January 1958		m	Imperial 5492 (1958), Let's Dance with Domino (1963)
**"You Always Hurt the One You Love"**	Doris Fisher, Allan Roberts	6 August 1960		m	...A Lot of Dominos! (mono) (1960)
**"You Always Hurt the One You Love"**	Doris Fisher, Allan Roberts	6 August 1960		s	...A Lot of Dominos! (stereo) (1960)
**"You Can Pack Your Suitcase"**	A. Domino, D. Bartholomew	14 March 1954		m	Imperial 5301 (1954), Here Stands Fats Domino (1957)
**"You Done Me Wrong"**	A. Domino	14 December 1953		m	Imperial 5272 (1954), This Is Fats Domino! (1956)
**"You Know I Miss You"**	A. Domino, Al Young	January 1951	Version 1	m	Imperial 5167 (1952), This Is Fats (1957)
**"You Know I Miss You"**	A. Domino, Al Young	11 January 1964	Version 2	m	Fats on Fire (mono) (1964)
**"You Know I Miss You"**	A. Domino, Al Young	11 January 1964	Version 2	s	Fats on Fire (stereo) (1964)
**"You Left Me"**	A. Domino, D. Bartholomew	19 September 1953		m	Let's Play Fats Domino (1959)
**"You Made a Vow"**	A. Domino	January 2000		s	Alive and Kickin' (2006)
**"You Said You Love Me"**	A. Domino, D. Bartholomew	18 April 1953		m	Imperial 5251 (1953), Rock and Rollin' with Fats Domino (1956)
**"You Win Again"**	Hank Williams	20 June 1961		m-ed1	Let the Four Winds Blow (mono) (1961)
**"You Win Again"**	Hank Williams	20 June 1961		s-ed1	Let the Four Winds Blow (stereo) (1961)
**"You Win Again"**	Hank Williams	20 June 1961		m-ed2	Imperial 5816 (1962)
**"You Win Again"**	Hank Williams	20 June 1961		r	Out of New Orleans (1993)
**"Young School Girl"**	A. Domino, D. Bartholomew	14 June 1958		m	Imperial X5537 (1958), The Fabulous "Mr. D" (1958)
**"Your Cheating Heart"**	Hank Williams	20 June 1961		m	Let the Four Winds Blow (mono) (1961)
**"Your Cheating Heart"**	Hank Williams	20 June 1961		s	Let the Four Winds Blow (stereo) (1961)
**"Your Cheating Heart"**	Hank Williams	20 June 1961		m-oc	Here He Comes Again! (1963), Imperial 66016 (1964)

== Live recordings ==
=== Preliminary observation ===
Unlike studio recordings, live recordings are rarely accompanied by related information in the releases. In many cases it was necessary to ascertain whether a recording was indeed part of the particular concert referred to in the particular release. This has been done by way of checking real concert tracklists (this information is scattered across numerous sources, both printed and online) and comparing them to the tracks listed in the releases, as well as by actually listening to recordings and comparing them. Here is the result of this research work.

Some so-called "concerts" referred to in the releases actually included material from two or more shows, separated by several hours or even days. For any song that had been performed and/or included twice (or more) within the same "concert", the notes "Show 1", "Show 2" etc. are added right after the date and venue. This does not reflect the actual order of any such shows (which is not really possible), but is merely a way to distinguish them.

Only live recordings published on vinyl records and CDs, including bootlegs, are listed. Cassettes VHS, DVDs and other similar sources are not included in the list.

The attributes of such live recordings are similar to those of studio recordings.

=== Alphabetical list of live recordings ===
Title	Songwriter(s)	Event date	Venue	Attr.	First release
"After Hours" (instr.)	Avery Parrish	1969–1971	Philadelphia	m	On Stage! (1983) (Note: Wrongly titled "Fat Man".)
"After Hours / I Almost Lost My Mind" (medley)	Avery Parrish / J. Hunter	22 August 1985	Universal Amphitheatre, Los Angeles	s	His Greatest Hits (MCA) (1986)
"Ain't It a Shame"	A. Domino, D. Bartholomew	13 June 1965	Las Vegas	m	Fats Domino '65 (mono) (1965)
"Ain't It a Shame"	A. Domino, D. Bartholomew	13 June 1965	Las Vegas	s	Fats Domino '65 (stereo) (1965)
"Ain't It a Shame"	A. Domino, D. Bartholomew	27 February 1969	New Orleans, Mardi Gras	s	It's Not Over 'Till (1990)
"Ain't It a Shame"	A. Domino, D. Bartholomew	20 and 29 March 1977	Munich and Hof, West Germany	s	Live in Europe (1977)
"Ain't It a Shame"	A. Domino, D. Bartholomew	22 August 1985	Universal Amphitheatre, Los Angeles	s	His Greatest Hits (MCA) (1986)
"Ain't It a Shame"	A. Domino, D. Bartholomew	22 October 1986	Austin, Texas, Austin City Limits	s	Live from Austin TX (2006)
"Ain't It a Shame"	A. Domino, D. Bartholomew	3 November 1987	New Orleans, The Hilton Hotel	m	Goin' Home: Live in New Orleans '87 (2015)
"Ain't It a Shame"	A. Domino, D. Bartholomew	June 1989	Galveston and Houston, Texas, show 1	s	Fats Domino Live (Golden Legends) (2006)
"Ain't It a Shame"	A. Domino, D. Bartholomew	June 1989	Galveston and Houston, Texas, show 2	s	Antoine "Fats" Domino (1989)
"Ain't It a Shame"	A. Domino, D. Bartholomew	31 December 1999	New Orleans, The Hyatt Hotel	m	A New Year's Eve Celebration! (2012)
"Ain't That a Shame"	→ "Ain't It a Shame"				
"Ain't That Just Like a Woman"	Claude Demetrius, Fleecie Moore	1969–1971	Philadelphia	s	La Grande Storia del Rock, 16 (1981)
"All By Myself"	A. Domino, D. Bartholomew	2 April 1981	Hamburg, West Germany	m	Live at the C.C.H. Hamburg 1981 (2005)
"All By Myself"	A. Domino, D. Bartholomew	22 October 1986	Austin, Texas, Austin City Limits	s	Live from Austin TX (2006)
"Another Mule"	→ "Man That's All"				
"Be My Guest"	A. Domino, Tommy Boyce, John Marascalco	20 and 29 March 1977	Munich and Hof, West Germany	s	Live in Europe (1977)
"Be My Guest"	A. Domino, Tommy Boyce, John Marascalco	June 1989	Galveston and Houston, Texas	s	Antoine "Fats" Domino (1989)
"Blue Monday"	A. Domino, D. Bartholomew	20 July 1962	Juan-les-Pins, Antibes, France, Jazz Festival	m	Antibes 1962: Live (2017)
"Blue Monday"	A. Domino, D. Bartholomew	13 June 1965	Las Vegas	s	Attention! Fats Domino! Vol. 2 (1970)
"Blue Monday"	A. Domino, D. Bartholomew	27 February 1969	New Orleans, Mardi Gras	s	It's Not Over 'Till (1990)
"Blue Monday"	A. Domino, D. Bartholomew	1969-1971, show 1	Philadelphia	s	Lady Madonna (1979)
"Blue Monday"	A. Domino, D. Bartholomew	1969-1971, show 2	Philadelphia	s	Blueberry Hill (1979)
"Blue Monday"	A. Domino, D. Bartholomew	1 May 1973	Montreux, Switzerland	s	Hello Josephine (1974)
"Blue Monday"	A. Domino, D. Bartholomew	19 March 1976	Bussum, Netherlands, TV show 'Net Spant'	m	Live '76 (1992)
"Blue Monday"	A. Domino, D. Bartholomew	20 and 29 March 1977	Munich and Hof, West Germany	s	Live in Europe (1977)
"Blue Monday"	A. Domino, D. Bartholomew	2 April 1981	Hamburg, West Germany	m	Live at the C.C.H. Hamburg 1981 (2005)
"Blue Monday"	A. Domino, D. Bartholomew	22 August 1985	Universal Amphitheatre, Los Angeles	s	His Greatest Hits (MCA) (1986)
"Blue Monday"	A. Domino, D. Bartholomew	22 October 1986	Austin, Texas, Austin City Limits	s	Live from Austin TX (2006)
"Blue Monday"	A. Domino, D. Bartholomew	3 November 1987	New Orleans, The Hilton Hotel	m	Goin' Home: Live in New Orleans '87 (2015)
"Blue Monday"	A. Domino, D. Bartholomew	June 1989	Galveston and Houston, Texas	s	Antoine "Fats" Domino (1989)
"Blue Monday"	A. Domino, D. Bartholomew	31 December 1999	New Orleans, The Hyatt Hotel	m	A New Year's Eve Celebration! (2012)
"Blue Monday"	A. Domino, D. Bartholomew	6 May 2001	New Orleans, Jazz & Heritage Festival	s	Fats Domino Live! (2003)
"Blueberry Hill"	A. Domino, D. Bartholomew	20 July 1962	Juan-les-Pins, Antibes, France, Jazz Festival	m	Antibes 1962: Live (2017)
"Blueberry Hill"	A. Domino, D. Bartholomew	13 June 1965	Las Vegas	m	Fats Domino '65 (mono) (1965)
"Blueberry Hill"	A. Domino, D. Bartholomew	13 June 1965	Las Vegas	s	Fats Domino '65 (stereo) (1965)
"Blueberry Hill"	A. Domino, D. Bartholomew	27 February 1969	New Orleans, Mardi Gras	s	It's Not Over 'Till (1990)
"Blueberry Hill"	A. Domino, D. Bartholomew	1970	New York City, Madison Square Garden	s	Let the Good Times Roll (soundtrack) (1973)
"Blueberry Hill"	A. Domino, D. Bartholomew	1969-1971, show 1	Philadelphia	m	On Stage! (1983)
"Blueberry Hill"	A. Domino, D. Bartholomew	1969-1971, show 2	Philadelphia	s	Blueberry Hill (1979)
"Blueberry Hill"	A. Domino, D. Bartholomew	1969-1971, show 3	Philadelphia	s	Lady Madonna (1979)
"Blueberry Hill"	A. Domino, D. Bartholomew	1 May 1973	Montreux, Switzerland	s	Hello Josephine (1974)
"Blueberry Hill"	A. Domino, D. Bartholomew	19 March 1976	Bussum, Netherlands, TV show 'Net Spant'	m	Live '76 (1992)
"Blueberry Hill"	A. Domino, D. Bartholomew	20 and 29 March 1977	Munich and Hof, West Germany	s	Live in Europe (1977)
"Blueberry Hill"	A. Domino, D. Bartholomew	2 April 1981	Hamburg, West Germany	m	Live at the C.C.H. Hamburg 1981 (2005)
"Blueberry Hill"	A. Domino, D. Bartholomew	22 August 1985	Universal Amphitheatre, Los Angeles	s	His Greatest Hits (MCA) (1986)
"Blueberry Hill"	A. Domino, D. Bartholomew	22 October 1986	Austin, Texas, Austin City Limits	s	Live from Austin TX (2006)
"Blueberry Hill"	A. Domino, D. Bartholomew	3 November 1987	New Orleans, The Hilton Hotel	m	Goin' Home: Live in New Orleans '87 (2015)
"Blueberry Hill"	A. Domino, D. Bartholomew	3 November 1987	New Orleans, The Hilton Hotel, reprise	m	Goin' Home: Live in New Orleans '87 (2015)
"Blueberry Hill"	A. Domino, D. Bartholomew	June 1989	Galveston and Houston, Texas, show 1	s	Fats Domino Live (Golden Legends) (2006)
"Blueberry Hill"	A. Domino, D. Bartholomew	June 1989	Galveston and Houston, Texas, show 2	s	Antoine "Fats" Domino (1989)
"Blueberry Hill"	A. Domino, D. Bartholomew	19 March 1990	Hilversum, Netherlands, TV "Holiday Show"	m	The Fat Man (1996)
"Blueberry Hill"	A. Domino, D. Bartholomew	31 December 1999	New Orleans, The Hyatt Hotel	m	A New Year's Eve Celebration! (2012)
"Blueberry Hill"	A. Domino, D. Bartholomew	6 May 2001	New Orleans, Jazz & Heritage Festival	s	Fats Domino Live! (2003)
"C.C. Rider"	Ma Rainey, Lena Arant	June 1989	Galveston and Houston, Texas	s	Antoine "Fats" Domino (1989)
"Dance with Mr. Domino" (Note: Titled "Domino Twist" in most releases.)	A. Domino, D. Bartholomew	13 June 1965	Las Vegas	m	Fats Domino '65 (mono) (1965)
"Dance with Mr. Domino"	A. Domino, D. Bartholomew	13 June 1965	Las Vegas	s	Fats Domino '65 (stereo) (1965)
"Dance with Mr. Domino"	A. Domino, D. Bartholomew	20 and 29 March 1977	Munich and Hof, West Germany	s	Tonite: Live in Concert (1985)
"Domino Stomp" (instr.)	A. Domino	22 August 1985	Universal Amphitheatre, Los Angeles	s	His Greatest Hits (PolyTel) (1987)
"Domino Twist"	→ "Dance with Mr. Domino"				
"Fat Man"	→ "After Hours"				
"Fats Boogie"	→ "Domino Stomp"				
"Four Winds"	→ "Let the Four Winds Blow"				
"Goin' Home"	A. Domino, Al Young	1969–1971	Philadelphia	s	Lady Madonna (1979) (Note: Wrongly titled "I Can't Go on This Way" and incomplete (without beginning).)
"Goin' Home"	A. Domino, Al Young	20 and 29 March 1977	Munich and Hof, West Germany	s	Live in Europe (1977)
"Goin' Home"	A. Domino, Al Young	3 November 1987	New Orleans, The Hilton Hotel	m	Goin' Home: Live in New Orleans '87 (2015)
"Goin' Home"	A. Domino, Al Young	3 November 1987	New Orleans, The Hilton Hotel, reprise	m	Goin' Home: Live in New Orleans '87 (2015)
"Goin' to the Mardi Gras"	→ "Mardi Gras in New Orleans"				
"Going to the River"	A. Domino, D. Bartholomew	22 August 1985	Universal Amphitheatre, Los Angeles	s	His Greatest Hits (MCA) (1986)
"Going to the River"	A. Domino, D. Bartholomew	June 1989	Galveston and Houston, Texas	s	Antoine "Fats" Domino (1989)
"Going to the River"	A. Domino, D. Bartholomew	6 May 2001	New Orleans, Jazz & Heritage Festival	s	Fats Domino Live! (2003)
"Hello Josephine"	→ "My Girl Josephine"				
"I Can't Go On"	A. Domino, D. Bartholomew	22 August 1985	Universal Amphitheatre, Los Angeles	s	His Greatest Hits (MCA) (1986)
"I Can't Go On"	A. Domino, D. Bartholomew	June 1989	Galveston and Houston, Texas	s	Antoine "Fats" Domino (1989)
"I Can't Go on This Way"	→ "Goin' Home"				
"I Hear You Knocking"	D. Bartholomew, Pearl King	22 October 1986	Austin, Texas, Austin City Limits	s	Live from Austin TX (2006)
"I Wanna Walk You Home"	→ "I Want to Walk You Home"				
"I Want to Walk with You"	→ "I Want to Walk You Home"				
"I Want to Walk You Home"	A. Domino	13 June 1965	Las Vegas	s	Attention! Fats Domino! Vol. 2 (1970)
"I Want to Walk You Home"	A. Domino	27 February 1969	New Orleans, Mardi Gras	s	It's Not Over 'Till (1990)
"I Want to Walk You Home"	A. Domino	1969-1971, show 1	Philadelphia	m	On Stage! (1983)
"I Want to Walk You Home"	A. Domino	1969-1971, show 2	Philadelphia	s	Lady Madonna (1979)
"I Want to Walk You Home"	A. Domino	1 May 1973	Montreux, Switzerland	s	Hello Josephine (1974)
"I Want to Walk You Home"	A. Domino	19 March 1976	Bussum, Netherlands, TV show 'Net Spant'	m	Live '76 (1992)
"I Want to Walk You Home"	A. Domino	20 and 29 March 1977	Munich and Hof, West Germany	s	Live in Europe (1977)
"I Want to Walk You Home"	A. Domino	2 April 1981	Hamburg, West Germany	m	Live at the C.C.H. Hamburg 1981 (2005)
"I Want to Walk You Home"	A. Domino	22 August 1985	Universal Amphitheatre, Los Angeles	s	His Greatest Hits (MCA) (1986)
"I Want to Walk You Home"	A. Domino	22 October 1986	Austin, Texas, Austin City Limits	s	Live from Austin TX (2006)
"I Want to Walk You Home"	A. Domino	3 November 1987	New Orleans, The Hilton Hotel	m	Goin' Home: Live in New Orleans '87 (2015)
"I Want to Walk You Home"	A. Domino	June 1989	Galveston and Houston, Texas	s	Antoine "Fats" Domino (1989)
"I Want to Walk You Home"	A. Domino	31 December 1999	New Orleans, The Hyatt Hotel	m	A New Year's Eve Celebration! (2012)
"I'm Gonna Be a Wheel Some Day"	A. Domino, D. Bartholomew, Roy Hayes	13 June 1965	Las Vegas	m	Fats Domino '65 (mono) (1965)
"I'm Gonna Be a Wheel Some Day"	A. Domino, D. Bartholomew, Roy Hayes	13 June 1965	Las Vegas	s	Fats Domino '65 (stereo) (1965)
"I'm Gonna Be a Wheel Some Day"	A. Domino, D. Bartholomew, Roy Hayes	1 May 1973	Montreux, Switzerland	s	Hello Josephine (1974)
"I'm Gonna Be a Wheel Some Day"	A. Domino, D. Bartholomew, Roy Hayes	19 March 1976	Bussum, Netherlands, TV show 'Net Spant'	m	Live '76 (1992)
"I'm Gonna Be a Wheel Some Day"	A. Domino, D. Bartholomew, Roy Hayes	20 and 29 March 1977	Munich and Hof, West Germany	s	Live in Europe (1977)
"I'm Gonna Be a Wheel Some Day"	A. Domino, D. Bartholomew, Roy Hayes	2 April 1981	Hamburg, West Germany	m	Live at the C.C.H. Hamburg 1981 (2005)
"I'm Gonna Be a Wheel Some Day"	A. Domino, D. Bartholomew, Roy Hayes	22 August 1985	Universal Amphitheatre, Los Angeles	s	His Greatest Hits (MCA) (1986)
"I'm Gonna Be a Wheel Some Day"	A. Domino, D. Bartholomew, Roy Hayes	June 1989	Galveston and Houston, Texas, show 1	s	Fats Domino Live (Golden Legends) (2006)
"I'm Gonna Be a Wheel Some Day"	A. Domino, D. Bartholomew, Roy Hayes	June 1989	Galveston and Houston, Texas, show 2	s	Antoine "Fats" Domino (1989)
"I'm Gonna Be a Wheel Some Day"	A. Domino, D. Bartholomew, Roy Hayes	6 May 2001	New Orleans, Jazz & Heritage Festival	s	Fats Domino Live! (2003)
"I'm in Love Again"	A. Domino, D. Bartholomew	20 July 1962	Juan-les-Pins, Antibes, France, Jazz Festival	m	Antibes 1962: Live (2017)
"I'm in Love Again"	A. Domino, D. Bartholomew	13 June 1965	Las Vegas	s	My Blue Heaven (1971)
"I'm in Love Again"	A. Domino, D. Bartholomew	1969-1971, show 1	Philadelphia	m	On Stage! (1983)
"I'm in Love Again"	A. Domino, D. Bartholomew	1969-1971, show 2	Philadelphia	s	Blueberry Hill (1979)
"I'm in Love Again"	A. Domino, D. Bartholomew	1969-1971, show 3	Philadelphia	s	Lady Madonna (1979)
"I'm in Love Again"	A. Domino, D. Bartholomew	1 May 1973	Montreux, Switzerland	s	Hello Josephine (1974)
"I'm in Love Again"	A. Domino, D. Bartholomew	19 March 1976	Bussum, Netherlands, TV show 'Net Spant'	m	Live '76 (1992)
"I'm in Love Again"	A. Domino, D. Bartholomew	22 October 1986	Austin, Texas, Austin City Limits	s	Live from Austin TX (2006)
"I'm in Love Again"	A. Domino, D. Bartholomew	31 December 1999	New Orleans, The Hyatt Hotel	m	A New Year's Eve Celebration! (2012)
"I'm in Love Again"	A. Domino, D. Bartholomew	6 May 2001	New Orleans, Jazz & Heritage Festival	s	Fats Domino Live! (2003)
"I'm in Love Again / Honey Chile" (medley)	A. Domino, D. Bartholomew / A. Domino, D. Bartholomew	20 and 29 March 1977	Munich and Hof, West Germany	s	Live in Europe (1977)
"I'm in Love Again / Honey Chile" (medley)	A. Domino, D. Bartholomew / A. Domino, D. Bartholomew	2 April 1981	Hamburg, West Germany	m	Live at the C.C.H. Hamburg 1981 (2005)
"I'm in Love Again / Honey Chile" (medley)	A. Domino, D. Bartholomew / A. Domino, D. Bartholomew	22 August 1985	Universal Amphitheatre, Los Angeles	s	His Greatest Hits (MCA) (1986)
"I'm in Love Again / Honey Chile" (medley)	A. Domino, D. Bartholomew / A. Domino, D. Bartholomew	3 November 1987	New Orleans, The Hilton Hotel	m	Goin' Home: Live in New Orleans '87 (2015)
"I'm in Love Again / Honey Chile" (medley)	A. Domino, D. Bartholomew / A. Domino, D. Bartholomew	June 1989	Galveston and Houston, Texas, show 1	s	Fats Domino Live (Golden Legends) (2006)
"I'm in Love Again / Honey Chile" (medley)	A. Domino, D. Bartholomew / A. Domino, D. Bartholomew	June 1989	Galveston and Houston, Texas, show 2	s	Antoine "Fats" Domino (1989)
"I'm in Love Again / Most of All" (medley)	A. Domino, D. Bartholomew / A. Domino	27 February 1969	New Orleans, Mardi Gras	s	It's Not Over 'Till (1990)
"I'm in the Mood for Love"	Jimmy McHugh, Dorothy Fields	13 June 1965	Las Vegas	m	Fats Domino '65 (mono) (1965)
"I'm in the Mood for Love"	Jimmy McHugh, Dorothy Fields	13 June 1965	Las Vegas	s	Fats Domino '65 (stereo) (1965)
"I'm in the Mood for Love"	Jimmy McHugh, Dorothy Fields	20 and 29 March 1977	Munich and Hof, West Germany	s	Tonite: Live in Concert (1985)
"I'm in the Mood for Love"	Jimmy McHugh, Dorothy Fields	3 November 1987	New Orleans, The Hilton Hotel	m	Goin' Home: Live in New Orleans '87 (2015) (Note: Faded-in fragment only.)
"I'm in the Mood for Love"	Jimmy McHugh, Dorothy Fields	June 1989	Galveston and Houston, Texas	s	Antoine "Fats" Domino (1989)
"I'm Ready"	Sylvester Bradford, Al Lewis, A. Domino	20 July 1962	Juan-les-Pins, Antibes, France, Jazz Festival	m	Antibes 1962: Live (2017)
"I'm Ready"	Sylvester Bradford, Al Lewis, A. Domino	13 June 1965	Las Vegas	s	My Blue Heaven (1971)
"I'm Ready"	Sylvester Bradford, Al Lewis, A. Domino	20 and 29 March 1977	Munich and Hof, West Germany	s	Live in Europe (1977)
"I'm Ready"	Sylvester Bradford, Al Lewis, A. Domino	2 April 1981	Hamburg, West Germany	m	Live at the C.C.H. Hamburg 1981 (2005)
"I'm Ready"	Sylvester Bradford, Al Lewis, A. Domino	22 August 1985	Universal Amphitheatre, Los Angeles	s	His Greatest Hits (MCA) (1986)
"I'm Ready"	Sylvester Bradford, Al Lewis, A. Domino	22 October 1986	Austin, Texas, Austin City Limits	s	Live from Austin TX (2006)
"I'm Ready"	Sylvester Bradford, Al Lewis, A. Domino	3 November 1987	New Orleans, The Hilton Hotel	m	Goin' Home: Live in New Orleans '87 (2015)
"I'm Ready"	Sylvester Bradford, Al Lewis, A. Domino	31 December 1999	New Orleans, The Hyatt Hotel	m	A New Year's Eve Celebration! (2012)
"I'm Ready"	Sylvester Bradford, Al Lewis, A. Domino	6 May 2001	New Orleans, Jazz & Heritage Festival	s	Fats Domino Live! (2003)
"I'm Walkin'"	A. Domino, D. Bartholomew	20 July 1962	Juan-les-Pins, Antibes, France, Jazz Festival	m	Antibes 1962: Live (2017)
"I'm Walkin'"	A. Domino, D. Bartholomew	13 June 1965	Las Vegas	s	Attention! Fats Domino! Vol. 2 (1970)
"I'm Walkin'"	A. Domino, D. Bartholomew	27 February 1969	New Orleans, Mardi Gras	s	It's Not Over 'Till (1990)
"I'm Walkin'"	A. Domino, D. Bartholomew	1969–1971	Philadelphia	s	Lady Madonna (1979)
"I'm Walkin'"	A. Domino, D. Bartholomew	1 May 1973	Montreux, Switzerland	s	Hello Josephine (1974)
"I'm Walkin'"	A. Domino, D. Bartholomew	2 April 1981	Hamburg, West Germany	m	Live at the C.C.H. Hamburg 1981 (2005)
"I'm Walkin'"	A. Domino, D. Bartholomew	22 August 1985	Universal Amphitheatre, Los Angeles	s	His Greatest Hits (MCA) (1986)
"I'm Walkin'"	A. Domino, D. Bartholomew	22 August 1985, with Ricky Nelson	Universal Amphitheatre, Los Angeles	s	An Evening with Fats Domino (1995)
"I'm Walkin'"	A. Domino, D. Bartholomew	22 October 1986	Austin, Texas, Austin City Limits	s	Live from Austin TX (2006)
"I'm Walkin'"	A. Domino, D. Bartholomew	June 1989	Galveston and Houston, Texas	s	Antoine "Fats" Domino (1989)
"I'm Walkin'"	A. Domino, D. Bartholomew	19 March 1990	Hilversum, Netherlands, TV "Holiday Show"	m	The Fat Man (1996)
"I'm Walkin'"	A. Domino, D. Bartholomew	31 December 1999	New Orleans, The Hyatt Hotel	m	A New Year's Eve Celebration! (2012)
"I'm Walkin'"	A. Domino, D. Bartholomew	6 May 2001	New Orleans, Jazz & Heritage Festival	s	Fats Domino Live! (2003)
"Jambalaya (On the Bayou)"	Hank Williams	13 June 1965	Las Vegas	m	Fats Domino '65 (mono) (1965)
"Jambalaya (On the Bayou)"	Hank Williams	13 June 1965	Las Vegas	s	Fats Domino '65 (stereo) (1965)
"Jambalaya (On the Bayou)"	Hank Williams	1 May 1973	Montreux, Switzerland	s	Hello Josephine (1974)
"Jambalaya (On the Bayou)"	Hank Williams	19 March 1976	Bussum, Netherlands, TV show 'Net Spant'	m	Live '76 (1992)
"Jambalaya (On the Bayou)"	Hank Williams	20 and 29 March 1977	Munich and Hof, West Germany	s	Live in Europe (1977)
"Jambalaya (On the Bayou)"	Hank Williams	2 April 1981	Hamburg, West Germany	m	Live at the C.C.H. Hamburg 1981 (2005)
"Jambalaya (On the Bayou)"	Hank Williams	22 August 1985	Universal Amphitheatre, Los Angeles	s	His Greatest Hits (MCA) (1986)
"Jambalaya (On the Bayou)"	Hank Williams	3 November 1987	New Orleans, The Hilton Hotel	m	Goin' Home: Live in New Orleans '87 (2015)
"Jambalaya (On the Bayou)"	Hank Williams	June 1989	Galveston and Houston, Texas	s	Antoine "Fats" Domino (1989)
"Jambalaya (On the Bayou)"	Hank Williams	31 December 1999	New Orleans, The Hyatt Hotel	m	A New Year's Eve Celebration! (2012)
"Josephine"	→ "My Girl Josephine"				
"Lady in Black"	→ "The Lady in Black"				
"Lady Madonna"	John Lennon, Paul McCartney	27 February 1969	New Orleans, Mardi Gras	s	It's Not Over 'Till (1990)
"Lady Madonna"	John Lennon, Paul McCartney	1969-1971	Philadelphia	s	Lady Madonna (1979)
"Lawdy Miss Clawdy"	Lloyd Price	1969-1971, show 1	Philadelphia	m	On Stage! (1983)
"Lawdy Miss Clawdy"	Lloyd Price	1969-1971, show 2	Philadelphia	s	Blueberry Hill (1979)
"Let the Four Winds Blow"	A. Domino, D. Bartholomew	13 June 1965	Las Vegas	m	Fats Domino '65 (mono) (1965)
"Let the Four Winds Blow"	A. Domino, D. Bartholomew	13 June 1965	Las Vegas	s	Fats Domino '65 (stereo) (1965)
"Let the Four Winds Blow"	A. Domino, D. Bartholomew	1969-1971, show 1	Philadelphia	m	On Stage! (1983)
"Let the Four Winds Blow"	A. Domino, D. Bartholomew	1969-1971, show 2	Philadelphia	s	Blueberry Hill (1979)
"Let the Four Winds Blow"	A. Domino, D. Bartholomew	1 May 1973	Montreux, Switzerland	s	Hello Josephine (1974)
"Let the Four Winds Blow"	A. Domino, D. Bartholomew	20 and 29 March 1977	Munich and Hof, West Germany	s	Tonite: Live in Concert (1985)
"Let the Four Winds Blow"	A. Domino, D. Bartholomew	2 April 1981	Hamburg, West Germany	m	Live at the C.C.H. Hamburg 1981 (2005)
"Let the Four Winds Blow"	A. Domino, D. Bartholomew	22 August 1985	Universal Amphitheatre, Los Angeles	s	His Greatest Hits (MCA) (1986)
"Let the Four Winds Blow"	A. Domino, D. Bartholomew	22 October 1986	Austin, Texas, Austin City Limits	s	Live from Austin TX (2006)
"Let the Four Winds Blow"	A. Domino, D. Bartholomew	June 1989	Galveston and Houston, Texas	s	Antoine "Fats" Domino (1989)
"Let the Four Winds Blow"	A. Domino, D. Bartholomew	31 December 1999	New Orleans, The Hyatt Hotel	m	A New Year's Eve Celebration! (2012)
"Let the Four Winds Blow"	A. Domino, D. Bartholomew	6 May 2001	New Orleans, Jazz & Heritage Festival	s	Fats Domino Live! (2003)
"Man That's All"	A. Domino, D. Bartholomew	June 1989	Galveston and Houston, Texas	s	Antoine "Fats" Domino (1989)
"Mardi Gras in New Orleans"	Henry Roeland Byrd	20 July 1962	Juan-les-Pins, Antibes, France, Jazz Festival	m	Antibes 1962: Live (2017)
"Mardi Gras in New Orleans"	Henry Roeland Byrd	13 June 1965	Las Vegas	s	Attention! Fats Domino! Vol. 2 (1970)
"Mardi Gras in New Orleans"	Henry Roeland Byrd	1969-1971	Philadelphia	s	La Grande Storia del Rock, 16 (1981)
"Mardi Gras in New Orleans"	Henry Roeland Byrd	1 May 1973	Montreux, Switzerland	s	Hello Josephine (1974)
"Mardi Gras in New Orleans"	Henry Roeland Byrd	June 1989	Galveston and Houston, Texas	s	Antoine "Fats" Domino (1989)
"Margie"	Con Conrad, J. Russel Robinson, Benny Davis	June 1989	Galveston and Houston, Texas	s	Antoine "Fats" Domino (1989)
"Misty" (instr.)	Not by Fats Domino (Note: This title from some concerts is performed by Fats Domino band only.)				
"My Blue Heaven"	Walter Donaldson, George A. Whiting	13 June 1965	Las Vegas	s	Attention! Fats Domino! Vol. 2 (1970)
"My Blue Heaven"	Walter Donaldson, George A. Whiting	27 February 1969	New Orleans, Mardi Gras	s	It's Not Over 'Till (1990)
"My Blue Heaven"	Walter Donaldson, George A. Whiting	1970	New York City, Madison Square Garden	s	Let the Good Times Roll (soundtrack) (1973)
"My Blue Heaven"	Walter Donaldson, George A. Whiting	22 October 1986	Austin, Texas, Austin City Limits	s	Live from Austin TX (2006)
"My Blue Heaven"	Walter Donaldson, George A. Whiting	3 November 1987	New Orleans, The Hilton Hotel	m	Goin' Home: Live in New Orleans '87 (2015)
"My Blue Heaven"	Walter Donaldson, George A. Whiting	June 1989	Galveston and Houston, Texas	s	Fats Domino Live (Golden Legends) (2006)
"My Blue Heaven"	Walter Donaldson, George A. Whiting	6 May 2001	New Orleans, Jazz & Heritage Festival	s	Fats Domino Live! (2003)
"My Girl Josephine" (Note: Titled "Hello Josephine" in some releases.)	A. Domino	20 July 1962	Juan-les-Pins, Antibes, France, Jazz Festival	m	Antibes 1962: Live (2017)
"My Girl Josephine"	A. Domino	1969-1971, show 1	Philadelphia	m	On Stage! (1983)
"My Girl Josephine"	A. Domino	1969-1971, show 2	Philadelphia	s	Lady Madonna (1979)
"My Girl Josephine"	A. Domino	1 May 1973	Montreux, Switzerland	s	Hello Josephine (1974)
"My Girl Josephine"	A. Domino	19 March 1976	Bussum, Netherlands, TV show 'Net Spant'	m	Live '76 (1992)
"My Girl Josephine"	A. Domino	20 and 29 March 1977	Munich and Hof, West Germany	s	Live in Europe (1977)
"My Girl Josephine"	A. Domino	2 April 1981	Hamburg, West Germany	m	Live at the C.C.H. Hamburg 1981 (2005)
"My Girl Josephine"	A. Domino	22 August 1985	Universal Amphitheatre, Los Angeles	s	His Greatest Hits (MCA) (1986)
"My Girl Josephine"	A. Domino	22 October 1986	Austin, Texas, Austin City Limits	s	Live from Austin TX (2006)
"My Girl Josephine"	A. Domino	3 November 1987	New Orleans, The Hilton Hotel	m	Goin' Home: Live in New Orleans '87 (2015)
"My Girl Josephine"	A. Domino	June 1989	Galveston and Houston, Texas, show 1	s	Fats Domino Live (Golden Legends) (2006)
"My Girl Josephine"	A. Domino	June 1989	Galveston and Houston, Texas, show 2	s	Antoine "Fats" Domino (1989)
"My Girl Josephine"	A. Domino	31 December 1999	New Orleans, The Hyatt Hotel	m	A New Year's Eve Celebration! (2012)
"My Girl Josephine"	A. Domino	6 May 2001	New Orleans, Jazz & Heritage Festival	s	Fats Domino Live! (2003)
"My Toot Toot"	Terrance Simien	22 August 1985	Universal Amphitheatre, Los Angeles	s	His Greatest Hits (MCA) (1986)
"Oh, What a Price"	→ "What a Price"				
"Please Don't Leave Me"	A. Domino	13 June 1965	Las Vegas	m	Fats Domino '65 (mono) (1965)
"Please Don't Leave Me"	A. Domino	13 June 1965	Las Vegas	s	Fats Domino '65 (stereo) (1965)
"Please Don't Leave Me"	A. Domino	1969-1971, show 1	Philadelphia	m	On Stage! (1983)
"Please Don't Leave Me"	A. Domino	1969-1971, show 2	Philadelphia	s	Blueberry Hill (1979)
"Please Don't Leave Me"	A. Domino	June 1989	Galveston and Houston, Texas	s	Antoine "Fats" Domino (1989)
"Poor Me"	A. Domino, D. Bartholomew	22 August 1985	Universal Amphitheatre, Los Angeles	s	His Greatest Hits (MCA) (1986)
"Poor Me"	A. Domino, D. Bartholomew	22 October 1986	Austin, Texas, Austin City Limits	s	Live from Austin TX (2006)
"Poor Me"	A. Domino, D. Bartholomew	June 1989	Galveston and Houston, Texas	s	Antoine "Fats" Domino (1989)
"Poor Me"	A. Domino, D. Bartholomew	31 December 1999	New Orleans, The Hyatt Hotel	m	A New Year's Eve Celebration! (2012)
"Poor Me"	A. Domino, D. Bartholomew	6 May 2001	New Orleans, Jazz & Heritage Festival	s	Fats Domino Live! (2003)
"Red Sails in the Sunset"	Hugh Williams, Jimmy Kennedy	20 and 29 March 1977	Munich and Hof, West Germany	s	Live in Europe (1977)
"Red Sails in the Sunset"	Hugh Williams, Jimmy Kennedy	2 April 1981	Hamburg, West Germany	m	Live at the C.C.H. Hamburg 1981 (2005)
"Red Sails in the Sunset"	Hugh Williams, Jimmy Kennedy	3 November 1987	New Orleans, The Hilton Hotel	m	Goin' Home: Live in New Orleans '87 (2015)
"Red Sails in the Sunset"	Hugh Williams, Jimmy Kennedy	June 1989	Galveston and Houston, Texas	s	Antoine "Fats" Domino (1989)
"Red Sails in the Sunset"	Hugh Williams, Jimmy Kennedy	31 December 1999	New Orleans, The Hyatt Hotel	m	A New Year's Eve Celebration! (2012)
"Rosalie"	→ "I Can't Go On"				
"Sentimental Journey" (instr.)	Les Brown	22 August 1985	Universal Amphitheatre, Los Angeles	s	His Greatest Hits (PolyTel) (1987)
"Shake, Rattle and Roll"	Charles E. Calhoun	22 August 1985	Universal Amphitheatre, Los Angeles	s	His Greatest Hits (MCA) (1986)
"Shake, Rattle and Roll"	Charles E. Calhoun	22 October 1986	Austin, Texas, Austin City Limits	s	Live from Austin TX (2006)
"Shake, Rattle and Roll"	Charles E. Calhoun	3 November 1987	New Orleans, The Hilton Hotel	m	Goin' Home: Live in New Orleans '87 (2015)
"Sick and Tired"	A. Domino, D. Bartholomew, Chris Kenner	2 April 1981	Hamburg, West Germany	m	Live at the C.C.H. Hamburg 1981 (2005)
"So Long"	A. Domino, D. Bartholomew	31 December 1999	New Orleans, The Hyatt Hotel	m	A New Year's Eve Celebration! (2012)
"So Long"	A. Domino, D. Bartholomew	6 May 2001	New Orleans, Jazz & Heritage Festival	s	Fats Domino Live! (2003)
"So Long / Natural Born Lover" (medley)	A. Domino, D. Bartholomew / A. Domino, D. Bartholomew	June 1989	Galveston and Houston, Texas	s	Antoine "Fats" Domino (1989)
"So Long / Natural Born Lover / C.C. Rider" (medley)	A. Domino, D. Bartholomew / A. Domino, D. Bartholomew / Ma Rainey, Lena Arant	20 and 29 March 1977	Munich and Hof, West Germany	s	Live in Europe (1977)
"So Long / Stormy Weather" (medley) (Note: "Stormy Weather" in this medley is performed as instrumental.)	A. Domino, D. Bartholomew / Harold Arlen, Ted Koehler	22 August 1985	Universal Amphitheatre, Los Angeles	s	His Greatest Hits (PolyTel) (1987)
"Song for Rosemary" (instr.)	A. Domino	2 April 1981	Hamburg, West Germany	m	Live at the C.C.H. Hamburg 1981 (2005)
"Song for Rosemary" (instr.)	A. Domino	June 1989	Galveston and Houston, Texas	s	Antoine "Fats" Domino (1989)
"Stagger Lee"	Lloyd Price, Harold Logan	1 May 1973	Montreux, Switzerland	s	Hello Josephine (1974)
"Stardust" (instr.)	Not by Fats Domino				
"Swanee River Hop" (instr.)	Traditional arranged by A. Domino, D. Bartholomew	3 November 1987	New Orleans, The Hilton Hotel	m	Goin' Home: Live in New Orleans '87 (2015)
"Telling Lies"	A. Domino, Earl Palmer	3 November 1987	New Orleans, The Hilton Hotel	m	Goin' Home: Live in New Orleans '87 (2015)
"The Fat Man"	A. Domino, D. Bartholomew	27 February 1969	New Orleans, Mardi Gras	s	It's Not Over 'Till (1990)
"The Fat Man"	A. Domino, D. Bartholomew	1969-1971	Philadelphia	s	Lady Madonna (1979)
"The Fat Man"	A. Domino, D. Bartholomew	19 March 1976	Bussum, Netherlands, TV show 'Net Spant'	m	Live '76 (1992)
"The Fat Man"	A. Domino, D. Bartholomew	20 and 29 March 1977	Munich and Hof, West Germany	s	Live in Europe (1977)
"The Fat Man"	A. Domino, D. Bartholomew	2 April 1981	Hamburg, West Germany	m	Live at the C.C.H. Hamburg 1981 (2005)
"The Fat Man"	A. Domino, D. Bartholomew	22 August 1985	Universal Amphitheatre, Los Angeles	s	His Greatest Hits (MCA) (1986)
"The Fat Man"	A. Domino, D. Bartholomew	3 November 1987	New Orleans, The Hilton Hotel	m	Goin' Home: Live in New Orleans '87 (2015)
"The Fat Man"	A. Domino, D. Bartholomew	June 1989	Galveston and Houston, Texas	s	Antoine "Fats" Domino (1989)
"The Fat Man"	A. Domino, D. Bartholomew	6 May 2001	New Orleans, Jazz & Heritage Festival	s	Fats Domino Live! (2003)
"The Girl I Love"	A. Domino, D. Bartholomew	6 May 2001	New Orleans, Jazz & Heritage Festival	s	Fats Domino Live! (2003)
"The Lady in Black"	A. Domino, D. Bartholomew	27 February 1969	New Orleans, Mardi Gras	s	It's Not Over 'Till (1990)
"The Lord Is Blessing Me / Auld Lang Syne" (medley)		31 December 1999	New Orleans, The Hyatt Hotel	m	A New Year's Eve Celebration! (2012)
"The Sheik of Araby"	Ted Snyder, Harry B. Smith, Francis Wheeler	3 November 1987	New Orleans, The Hilton Hotel	m	Goin' Home: Live in New Orleans '87 (2015)
"The Sheik of Araby"	Ted Snyder, Harry B. Smith, Francis Wheeler	June 1989	Galveston and Houston, Texas	s	Antoine "Fats" Domino (1989)
"Three Nights a Week"	A. Domino	20 July 1962	Juan-les-Pins, Antibes, France, Jazz Festival	m	Antibes 1962: Live (2017)
"Three Nights a Week"	A. Domino	22 October 1986	Austin, Texas, Austin City Limits	s	Live from Austin TX (2006)
"Tuxedo Junction" (instr.)	Not by Fats Domino				
"Valley of Tears"	A. Domino, D. Bartholomew	2 April 1981	Hamburg, West Germany	m	Live at the C.C.H. Hamburg 1981 (2005)
"Valley of Tears"	A. Domino, D. Bartholomew	3 November 1987	New Orleans, The Hilton Hotel	m	Goin' Home: Live in New Orleans '87 (2015)
"Valley of Tears"	A. Domino, D. Bartholomew	June 1989	Galveston and Houston, Texas	s	Antoine "Fats" Domino (1989)
"Walking to New Orleans"	A. Domino, D. Bartholomew, Robert Guidry	13 June 1965	Las Vegas	s	Attention! Fats Domino! Vol. 2 (1970)
"Walking to New Orleans"	A. Domino, D. Bartholomew, Robert Guidry	27 February 1969	New Orleans, Mardi Gras	s	It's Not Over 'Till (1990)
"Walking to New Orleans"	A. Domino, D. Bartholomew, Robert Guidry	1969-1971	Philadelphia	s	La Grande Storia del Rock, 16 (1981)
"Walking to New Orleans"	A. Domino, D. Bartholomew, Robert Guidry	1 May 1973	Montreux, Switzerland	s	Hello Josephine (1974)
"Walking to New Orleans"	A. Domino, D. Bartholomew, Robert Guidry	2 April 1981	Hamburg, West Germany	m	Live at the C.C.H. Hamburg 1981 (2005)
"Walking to New Orleans"	A. Domino, D. Bartholomew, Robert Guidry	22 August 1985	Universal Amphitheatre, Los Angeles	s	His Greatest Hits (MCA) (1986)
"Walking to New Orleans"	A. Domino, D. Bartholomew, Robert Guidry	22 October 1986	Austin, Texas, Austin City Limits	s	Live from Austin TX (2006)
"Walking to New Orleans"	A. Domino, D. Bartholomew, Robert Guidry	3 November 1987	New Orleans, The Hilton Hotel	m	Goin' Home: Live in New Orleans '87 (2015)
"Walking to New Orleans"	A. Domino, D. Bartholomew, Robert Guidry	June 1989	Galveston and Houston, Texas, show 1	s	Fats Domino Live (Golden Legends) (2006)
"Walking to New Orleans"	A. Domino, D. Bartholomew, Robert Guidry	June 1989	Galveston and Houston, Texas, show 2	s	Antoine "Fats" Domino (1989)
"Walking to New Orleans"	A. Domino, D. Bartholomew, Robert Guidry	31 December 1999	New Orleans, The Hyatt Hotel	m	A New Year's Eve Celebration! (2012)
"Walking to New Orleans"	A. Domino, D. Bartholomew, Robert Guidry	6 May 2001	New Orleans, Jazz & Heritage Festival	s	Fats Domino Live! (2003)
"What a Price" (Note: Titled "Oh, What a Price" in most releases.)	A. Domino, Jack Jessup, Pee Wee Maddux	20 July 1962	Juan-les-Pins, Antibes, France, Jazz Festival	m	Antibes 1962: Live (2017)
"What a Price"	A. Domino, Jack Jessup, Pee Wee Maddux	13 June 1965	Las Vegas	m	Fats Domino '65 (mono) (1965)
"What a Price"	A. Domino, Jack Jessup, Pee Wee Maddux	13 June 1965	Las Vegas	s	Fats Domino '65 (stereo) (1965)
"What a Price"	A. Domino, Jack Jessup, Pee Wee Maddux	20 and 29 March 1977	Munich and Hof, West Germany	s	Tonite: Live in Concert (1985)
"What a Price"	A. Domino, Jack Jessup, Pee Wee Maddux	3 November 1987	New Orleans, The Hilton Hotel	m	Goin' Home: Live in New Orleans '87 (2015)
"What a Price"	A. Domino, Jack Jessup, Pee Wee Maddux	June 1989	Galveston and Houston, Texas	s	Antoine "Fats" Domino (1989)
"When My Dreamboat Comes Home"	Dave Franklin, Cliff Friend	27 February 1969	New Orleans, Mardi Gras	s	It's Not Over 'Till (1990)
"When My Dreamboat Comes Home"	Dave Franklin, Cliff Friend	2 April 1981	Hamburg, West Germany	m	Live at the C.C.H. Hamburg 1981 (2005)
"When My Dreamboat Comes Home"	Dave Franklin, Cliff Friend	3 November 1987	New Orleans, The Hilton Hotel	m	Goin' Home: Live in New Orleans '87 (2015)
"When My Dreamboat Comes Home"	Dave Franklin, Cliff Friend	June 1989	Galveston and Houston, Texas	s	Fats Domino Live (Golden Legends) (2006)
"When My Dreamboat Comes Home"	Dave Franklin, Cliff Friend	31 December 1999	New Orleans, The Hyatt Hotel	m	A New Year's Eve Celebration! (2012)
"When My Dreamboat Comes Home"	Dave Franklin, Cliff Friend	6 May 2001	New Orleans, Jazz & Heritage Festival	s	Fats Domino Live! (2003)
"When the Saints Go Marching In"	Unknown, arranged by A. Domino, D. Bartholomew	20 July 1962	Juan-les-Pins, Antibes, France, Jazz Festival	m	Antibes 1962: Live (2017)
"When the Saints Go Marching In"	Unknown, arranged by A. Domino, D. Bartholomew	13 June 1965, show 1	Las Vegas	s	My Blue Heaven (1971)
"When the Saints Go Marching In"	Unknown, arranged by A. Domino, D. Bartholomew	22 August 1985	Universal Amphitheatre, Los Angeles	s	His Greatest Hits (PolyTel) (1987)
"When the Saints Go Marching In"	Unknown, arranged by A. Domino, D. Bartholomew	June 1989	Galveston and Houston, Texas, show 1	s	Fats Domino Live (Golden Legends) (2006)
"When the Saints Go Marching In / Deep in the Heart of Texas" (medley) (Note: "Deep in the Heart of Texas" in this medley is performed as instrumental.)	Unknown, arranged by A. Domino, D. Bartholomew / June Hershey, Don Swander	13 June 1965, show 2	Las Vegas	s	Attention! Fats Domino! Vol. 2 (1970)
"When the Saints Go Marching In / Deep in the Heart of Texas" (medley)	Unknown, arranged by A. Domino, D. Bartholomew / June Hershey, Don Swander	27 February 1969	New Orleans, Mardi Gras	s	It's Not Over 'Till (1990)
"When the Saints Go Marching In / Deep in the Heart of Texas" (medley)	Unknown, arranged by A. Domino, D. Bartholomew / June Hershey, Don Swander	1969-1971	Philadelphia	s	Blueberry Hill (1979)
"When the Saints Go Marching In / Deep in the Heart of Texas / Sentimental Journey" (medley) (Note: "Sentimental Journey" in this medley is performed as instrumental.)	Unknown, arranged by A. Domino, D. Bartholomew / June Hershey, Don Swander / Les Brown, Ben Homer, Bud Green	19 March 1976	Bussum, Netherlands, TV show 'Net Spant'	m	Live '76 (1992)
"When the Saints Go Marching In / Sentimental Journey" (medley)	Unknown, arranged by A. Domino, D. Bartholomew / Les Brown, Ben Homer, Bud Green	1 May 1973	Montreux, Switzerland	s	Hello Josephine (1974)
"When the Saints Go Marching In / Sentimental Journey" (medley)	Unknown, arranged by A. Domino, D. Bartholomew / Les Brown, Ben Homer, Bud Green	2 April 1981	Hamburg, West Germany	m	Live at the C.C.H. Hamburg 1981 (2005)
"When the Saints Go Marching In / Sentimental Journey" (medley)	Unknown, arranged by A. Domino, D. Bartholomew / Les Brown, Ben Homer, Bud Green	3 November 1987	New Orleans, The Hilton Hotel	m	Goin' Home: Live in New Orleans '87 (2015)
"When the Saints Go Marching In / Sentimental Journey" (medley)	Unknown, arranged by A. Domino, D. Bartholomew / Les Brown, Ben Homer, Bud Green	June 1989	Galveston and Houston, Texas, show 2	s	Antoine "Fats" Domino (1989)
"When the Saints Go Marching In / Sentimental Journey" (medley)	Unknown, arranged by A. Domino, D. Bartholomew / Les Brown, Ben Homer, Bud Green	31 December 1999	New Orleans, The Hyatt Hotel	m	A New Year's Eve Celebration! (2012)
"Whiskey Heaven"	Cliff Crofford, John Durrill, Snuff Garrett	2 April 1981	Hamburg, West Germany	m	Live at the C.C.H. Hamburg 1981 (2005)
"Whiskey Heaven"	Cliff Crofford, John Durrill, Snuff Garrett	June 1989	Galveston and Houston, Texas	s	Antoine "Fats" Domino (1989)
"Whole Lot of Loving"	→ "Whole Lotta Loving"				
"Whole Lotta Loving"	A. Domino, D. Bartholomew	13 June 1965	Las Vegas	m	Fats Domino '65 (mono) (1965)
"Whole Lotta Loving"	A. Domino, D. Bartholomew	13 June 1965	Las Vegas	s	Fats Domino '65 (stereo) (1965)
"Whole Lotta Loving"	A. Domino, D. Bartholomew	20 and 29 March 1977	Munich and Hof, West Germany	s	Live in Europe (1977)
"Whole Lotta Loving"	A. Domino, D. Bartholomew	2 April 1981	Hamburg, West Germany	m	Live at the C.C.H. Hamburg 1981 (2005)
"Whole Lotta Loving"	A. Domino, D. Bartholomew	22 August 1985	Universal Amphitheatre, Los Angeles	s	His Greatest Hits (MCA) (1986)
"Whole Lotta Loving"	A. Domino, D. Bartholomew	3 November 1987	New Orleans, The Hilton Hotel	m	Goin' Home: Live in New Orleans '87 (2015)
"Yes, It's Me and I'm in Love Again"	→ "I'm in Love Again"				
"You Can Pack Your Suitcase"	A. Domino, D. Bartholomew	20 July 1962	Juan-les-Pins, Antibes, France, Jazz Festival	m	Antibes 1962: Live (2017)
"You Win Again"	Hank Williams	13 June 1965	Las Vegas	s	Attention! Fats Domino! Vol. 2 (1970)
"Your Cheating Heart"	Hank Williams	27 February 1969	New Orleans, Mardi Gras	s	It's Not Over 'Till (1990)
"Your Cheating Heart"	Hank Williams	22 October 1986	Austin, Texas, Austin City Limits	s	Live from Austin TX (2006)
"Your Cheating Heart"	Hank Williams	3 November 1987	New Orleans, The Hilton Hotel	m	Goin' Home: Live in New Orleans '87 (2015)
"Your Cheating Heart"	Hank Williams	June 1989	Galveston and Houston, Texas	s	Antoine "Fats" Domino (1989)
