= Goin' Home: A Tribute to Fats Domino =

Compilation album by Various artists
- Released: September 25, 2007
- Recorded: 2007 and 1975 (John Lennon track)
- Genre: Rock; blues; rhythm and blues
- Label: Vanguard
- Producer: Adam Shipley; Bill Taylor

Various artists chronology
That's Fats: A Tribute to Fats Domino (1996)	Goin' Home: A Tribute to Fats Domino (2007)

Goin' Home: A Tribute to Fats Domino is a 2007 tribute album by various artists to Fats Domino, issued by Vanguard Records. Most of the songs were written by Domino and Dave Bartholomew.

== History ==
The purpose of the album, post-Hurricane Katrina, was to raise funds for New Orleans musical community, and to re-build Domino's New Orleans neighborhood through the creation of a community center in the Lower Ninth Ward. Funds were also earmarked to support Tipitina's Foundation, which works to protect the musical culture of New Orleans and is an organization which was supported by Domino.

== Reception ==
In contrast to an earlier tribute album, That's Fats: A Tribute to Fats Domino (Capitol, 1996), which mostly contained previously released cover versions, Goin' Home: A Tribute to Fats Domino is (with the exception of the opening track, by John Lennon) composed of newly recorded versions. The album is critically described as "...one of the more remarkable tribute albums to surface in recent years...spanning the worlds of rock (Neil Young, Elton John, Los Lobos, Tom Petty), blues (B.B. King), country (Willie Nelson), jazz (Herbie Hancock), and reggae (Toots & the Maytals)..."

== Track listing ==
1. John Lennon - "Ain't That a Shame"
2. Tom Petty & The Heartbreakers - "I'm Walkin'"
3. B.B. King and Ivan Neville's Dumpstaphunk - "Goin' Home"
4. Elton John - "Blueberry Hill"
5. Taj Mahal and the New Orleans Social Club - "My Girl Josephine"
6. Buddy Guy, the Dirty Dozen Brass Band and Joss Stone - "Every Night About This Time"
7. Allen Toussaint and Paul McCartney - "I Want to Walk You Home"
8. Rebirth Brass Band, Troy "Trombone Shorty" Andrews, Pee Wee Ellis, Fred Wesley, Maceo Parker and Lenny Kravitz - "Whole Lotta Lovin'"
9. Dr. John - "Don't Leave Me This Way"
10. Bonnie Raitt and Jon Cleary - "I'm in Love Again/All by Myself"
11. Art Neville - "Please Don't Leave Me"
12. Robbie Robertson and Galactic - "Going to the River"
13. Randy Newman - "Blue Monday"
14. Robert Plant and Lil Band O' Gold - "It Keeps Rainin'"
15. Corinne Bailey Rae - "One Night of Sin"
16. Neil Young - "Walking to New Orleans"
17. Robert Plant and the Soweto Gospel Choir - "Valley of Tears"
18. Norah Jones - "My Blue Heaven"
19. Lucinda Williams - "Honey Chile"
20. Sam Bush and Marc Broussard - "Rising Sun"
21. Olu Dara and the Natchezippi Band with Donald Harrison, Jr. - "When I See You"
22. Ben Harper and Skatalites - "Be My Guest"
23. Toots & the Maytals - "Let the Four Winds Blow"
24. Willie Nelson - "I Hear You Knockin'"
25. Irma Thomas and Marcia Ball - "I Just Can't Get New Orleans Off My Mind"
26. Bruce Hornsby - "Don't Blame It on Me"
27. Herbie Hancock, Ziggy Modeliste and Renard Poche - "I'm Gonna Be a Wheel Someday"
28. Los Lobos - "The Fat Man"
29. Big Chief Monk Boudreaux and Galactic - "So Long"
30. Theresa Andersson and the Preservation Hall Jazz Band - "When the Saints Go Marching In"

== Personnel ==
- Guitar: C.C. Adcock, Anthony Brown, Court Clement, John Fohl, John Goux, Davey Johnstone, Kwatei Jones-Quartey, Mike Keller, Leo Nocentelli, Jan Ozveren, Derwin Perkins, Doug Pettibone
- Bass: Oroh Angiama, David Barard, Don Bennett, Bob Birch, Phil Chen, Alonzo Gardner, George Porter Jr., David Ranson, Chris Severin, David Sutton, Calvin Turner
- Keyboards: Guy Babylon, Alex Bennett, Grub Cooper, David Egan, Calvin Turner, Rickie Monie
- Drums: Sam Agard, Grub Cooper, Herman "Roscoe" Ernest III, Chad Gilmore, Terence Higgins, Larry Johnson, Corey Keller, Jim Keltner, Joe Lastie, Herman Lebeaux, Jonathan Norton, Nigel Olsson, Shannon Powell, Warren Storm, Johnny Vidacovich
- Percussion: Grub Cooper, Jim Horn, John Mahon, Coster Massamba, Sipho Ngcamu, Calvin Turner
- Accordion: Steve Riley
- Double Bass: Walter Payton, Matt Perrine, Michael Valerio
- Saxophone: Darryl Adams, Alonzo Bowens, Pat Breaux, Jim Corry, Ronnie Cuber, Dean Fraser, Emile Hall, Herbert Hardesty, Kevin Harris, Donald Harrison, Jim Horn, Derek Huston, Dickie Landry, Bill Liston, Brent Rose, Thad Scott, Sam Skelton, Eric Traub
- Brass: John Brunious, Vin Gordon, Leroy Jones, Lee King, Craig Klein, Fred Lonzo, Clayton Reilly, Efrem Towns, Percy Williams
- Backing Vocals: Ladonna Harley-Peters, Susan Harriott, Virginia Rece, Calvin Turner, The Fisk Jubilee Singers
