= Lawdy Miss Clawdy =

Song written by Lloyd Price

Single by Lloyd Price and His Orchestra
- B-side: "Mailman Blues"
- Released: April 1952
- Recorded: March 13, 1952
- Studio: J&M (New Orleans, Louisiana)
- Genre: Rhythm and blues; rock and roll
- Length: 2:30
- Label: Specialty
- Songwriter: Lloyd Price
- Producer: Dave Bartholomew

Lloyd Price and His Orchestra singles chronology
"Lawdy Miss Clawdy" (1952)	"Oooh, Oooh, Oooh" (1952)

"Lawdy Miss Clawdy" is a song by New Orleans singer-songwriter Lloyd Price that "grandly introduced The New Orleans Sound". It was first recorded by Price in 1952 with Fats Domino and Dave Bartholomew during his first session for Art Rupe and Specialty Records. The song became one of the biggest selling R&B records of 1952 and crossed over to other audiences. "Lawdy Miss Clawdy" inspired many songs and has been recorded by a variety of artists.

== Background ==
While still in high school, Lloyd Price was working for New Orleans radio station WBOK. He provided jingles (music for radio advertisements) for various products, including those hawked by disc jockey James "Okey Dokey" Smith. One of Smith's catchphrases was "Lawdy Miss Clawdy", which he used in ad slogans such as "Lawdy Miss Clawdy, eat Mother's Homemade Pies and drink Maxwell House coffee!" Price's accompanying tune proved popular with the radio audience and he developed it into a full-length song.

In 1952, Art Rupe, founder of Specialty Records in Los Angeles, came to New Orleans in search of new talent. Local recording studio owner Cosimo Matassa introduced him to Dave Bartholomew, who co-wrote and produced many of Fats Domino's early hit records. Bartholomew invited nineteen-year-old Lloyd Price to audition for Rupe at Matassa's J&M Recording Studio.

The accounts differ on what happened next. According to Rupe, Price spent too much time rehearsing and Rupe threatened to leave if he did not get it together; Rupe then relented and Price turned out an emotional performance of "Lawdy Miss Clawdy", prompting Rupe to cancel his return flight and arrange for a recording session. Price remembered that he auditioned the song for Rupe and although he apparently liked it, he left for New York without arranging to record it; however, two months later Price recalled receiving a call "Art Rupe's back in town and he wants to record you".

== Recording and composition ==
"Lawdy Miss Clawdy" was recorded March 13, 1952, at Cosimo Matassa's J&M Studios in New Orleans. Producer Dave Bartholomew used his backing band for the session, which consisted of pianist Salvador Doucette, guitarist Ernest McLean, bassist Frank Fields, drummer Earl Palmer, and saxophonists Herbert Hardesty (tenor) and Joe Harris (alto). The first attempts at performing the song were not successful, reportedly because Bartholomew was dissatisfied with Doucette's piano part. When Fats Domino arrived at the studio, he was persuaded by Bartholomew to sit in on the recording. After one run through, Bartholomew announced "OK, that's it" and Matassa started the tape recorder.

"Lawdy Miss Clawdy" opens with Fats Domino's "rolling trills ... in a cascading, horn-like procession". Although Domino had recorded several songs using his trade-mark piano triplets style, Price's hit provided it with its greatest exposure up to that time. Domino repeats his intro for the piano solo. Another key element of the song is Earl Palmer's drumming, described as "loping, midtempo shuffle beats with their busy ride cymbal". This is anchored by Palmer's emphasis on the snare of the second and fourth beats of each bar, which led him to be referred to as "the father of the backbeat". In characteristic New Orleans-style, the rest of the backing instrumentation also contributes to the song's rhythmic drive by "providing different elements of rhythm, in several different patterns ... This complex, layered beat might also be compared to African polyrhythms".

"Lawdy Miss Clawdy" follows an eight-bar blues progression and has been notated in 12/8 time in the key of A♭. The song's melody is derived from Fats Domino's 1950 hit "The Fat Man", which he explained "came from an ol' blues tune called "Junkers Blues". Price's song also features most of the same backing musicians as Domino's song.

Price's vocals have been described as "heartbroken wails", "expressive, wailing", and "gritty". His lyrics deal with teenage angst over a relationship. A previous take of the song opens:

Oh now lawdy lawdy lawdy Miss Clawdy, girl who can your lover be
Well please don't excite me baby, no it can't be me

On the take that was released, Price confusingly uses a line from a later verse, "girl you sho' look good to me", but it stuck.

== Releases and charts ==
Specialty Records released "Lawdy Miss Clawdy" in April 1952 and on May 17, 1952, it entered Billboard's R&B chart, staying there a total of 26 weeks. The song reached number one, where it spent seven weeks. According to Art Rupe, the single sold nearly one million copies and record distributors reported that it was selling well outside of the usual R&B market, but it did not appear in Billboard's pop charts. "Lawdy Miss Clawdy" was also one of the top records for 1952 and the 1950s decade.

== Recognition and influence ==
"Lawdy Miss Clawdy" became "R&B Record of the Year" for 1952 in both Billboard and Cashbox magazines; it also earned Price Cashbox's "Best New R&B Singer of 1952" designation. In 1995, it was added to the Rock and Roll Hall of Fame's list of the "500 Songs That Shaped Rock and Roll". Authors Dawson and Propes discussed "Lawdy Miss Clawdy" among the first rock and roll songs.

"Lawdy Miss Clawdy" "set the pattern for the rock and roll years in New Orleans" and its success led many to try to emulate it; one author suggests "for a time, every new R&B song coming out of New Orleans sounded suspiciously like "Lawdy Miss Clawdy". In 1953, singer Tommy Ridgley, a friend of Price's who nearly recorded "Lawdy Miss Clawdy" first, recorded a follow-up tune "Oh, Lawdy, My Baby". In 1958, Larry Williams, who had been Lloyd Price's valet, reworked the song to become "Dizzy Miss Lizzy".

Price's song has also been identified as "one of the first rhythm and blues records to attract the attention of white Southern teenagers, among them Elvis Presley, who cut his own version four years later" and "becom[ing] a repertoire staple of local country bands". A variety of artists have recorded "Lawdy Miss Clawdy".

The song is included as a full-length performance by Price and Allen Toussaint in the 2005 documentary film Make It Funky!, which presents a history of New Orleans music and its influence on rhythm and blues, rock and roll, funk and jazz.
