= Every Night About This Time =

Every Night About This Time may refer to:

- "Every Night About This Time", a song by Fats Domino from the album Alive and Kickin'
- "Every Night About This Time", a song by Dave Alvin from, and an alternate title for, the album Romeo's Escape
- The Magic of Maxine Daniels... Every Night About This Time, an album by Maxine Daniels
