= Rock and Rollin' with Fats Domino =

Studio album by Fats Domino
- Released: March 1956
- Recorded: 1949–1955
- Genre: Rock and roll
- Length: 28:07
- Label: Imperial
- Producer: Bunny Robyn

Fats Domino chronology
Rock and Rollin' with Fats Domino (1956)	Fats Domino Rock and Rollin' (1956)

Professional ratings
Review scores
Source	Rating
AllMusic	3/5 stars

Rock and Rollin' with Fats Domino is the debut studio album by rock and roll pianist and vocalist Fats Domino, compiling a number of his hits and other material, some of which would soon become hits. All included recordings have been released previously on Imperial Records singles from 1950 to 1956. The album, which featured a woodcut portrait of the musician, reached No. 17 on the Billboard "Pop Albums" chart. It is believed to have been produced by engineer Bunny Robyn due to the notation on the cover "A Robyn Recording".

== Release history ==
The album was released on Imperial Records, catalog #LP-9004, in March 1956 and reissued by London Records under the title Carry on Rockin'.

In spite of the term "rock and rollin'", the artist was not convinced that his work was of that genre. In 1956, he made this comment: "What they call rock and roll is rhythm and blues, and I've been playing it for 15 years in New Orleans."

When Domino left Imperial in 1963 to join Paramount, Imperial retained the rights to this and several other of Domino's notable albums, reissuing it on LP as recently as 1981. In particular, the album was reissued in 1969 as stereo (in fact "Electronically re-recorded to simulate stereo", as printed on cover) by Liberty Records, the new owner of Imperial Records, with catalog# LP-12387 and later in 1978 by United Artists Records, the new owner of Liberty Records, with catalog# UAS 29.097. (Note: All releases and reissues of this album, like the other two albums by Imperial Records, Fats Domino Swings (12,000,000 Records) (1958) and Let's Dance with Domino (1963) and its reissues by subsequent owners of this label included the recording "Ain't It a Shame". Only in the reissue by London Records this recording was titled "Ain't That a Shame".)

It has subsequently been reissued in conjunction with another early Domino album, Million Sellers by Fats, as Rock and Rollin' with Fats Domino/Million Sellers by Fats.

== Songs ==
Although this was Domino's album debut, the R&B pianist had already been recording singles for seven years at the time of this release. The album compiled a number of Domino's hit singles as well as some songs that would soon become hit singles, including "Ain't It a Shame" (#1 ""Black Singles", #10 "Pop Singles"), "All by Myself" (#1 "Black Singles"), "Poor Me" (#1 "Black Singles"), "Bo Weevil" (#5 "Black Singles", #35 "Pop Singles") and "Don't Blame It On Me" (#9 "Black Singles"), but omitted "Don't You Know" (#7 "Black Singles"), "I Can't Go On" (#6 "Black Singles") and "Thinking of You" (#14, "Black Singles").

== Track listing ==
Except where otherwise noted, all songs by Dave Bartholomew and Fats Domino.

1. "The Fat Man" – 2:33
2. "Tired of Crying" (Domino) – 2:10
3. "Goin' Home" (Domino, Al Young) – 2:09
4. "You Said You Loved Me" – 2:32
5. "Going to the River" – 2:28
6. "Please Don't Leave Me" (Domino) – 2:30
7. "Rose Mary" – 2:10
8. "All by Myself" – 2:18
9. "Ain't It a Shame" – 2:23
10. "Poor Me" – 2:15
11. "Bo Weevil" – 2:01
12. "Don't Blame It on Me" – 2:38

== Personnel ==
- Fats Domino – piano, vocals
- Bunny Robyn – presumed producer
