= Walking to New Orleans (song) =

- Danish release picture sleeve

Single by Fats Domino
- B-side: "Don't Come Knockin'"
- Released: June 1960
- Studio: Cosimo (New Orleans, Louisiana)
- Genre: R&B
- Length: 1:54
- Label: Imperial; 5675
- Songwriter(s): Bobby Charles; Fats Domino; Dave Bartholomew
- Producer(s): Dave Bartholomew

Fats Domino singles chronology
"Before I Grow Too Old" (1960)	"Walking to New Orleans" (1960)	"Don't Come Knockin'" (1960)

"Walking to New Orleans" is a 1960 song by Fats Domino. It was written by Domino, Bobby Charles and Dave Bartholomew, and released on Imperial Records. The record was a hit, reaching No. 6 on the U.S. Pop chart and No. 2 on the R&B chart.

== Background ==
Domino was a hero of Charles. Domino had previously recorded the Charles tune "Before I Grow Too Old". When Domino stopped on tour in Lafayette, Louisiana, he invited Charles into his dressing room, and regretted he did not have a copy of his new record to give to Charles, but invited Charles to come visit him in Domino's home of New Orleans. Charles replied, "I don't have a car. If I'd go, I'd have to walk." Afterwards, the thought remained on Charles's mind, and he said he wrote the song for Domino in some 15 minutes.

After he got to New Orleans to accept Domino's invitation, Charles sang "Walking to New Orleans" for Domino. Domino was enthusiastic about the number and made a few modifications to it, including adding a quote from his earlier hit, "Ain't That a Shame". Dave Bartholomew made an orchestration for the backup band, and Domino with Bartholomew and band recorded it in Cosimo Matassa's studio on Rampart Street.

After the recording was made, Bartholomew decided to overdub a string section from the New Orleans Symphony. Use of classical strings was unusual for early rock and roll. Domino was at first somewhat surprised when Bartholomew played back the new version with strings, but warmed to the distinctive sweet melancholy sound it added. The strings were arranged by Milton Bush, a trombonist who was the first-call string arranger at Cosimo's Studio. Bush wrote the arrangements standing up in 10 minutes while Domino looked on. He basically had the strings mimic the melody in the previous phrase. When finished, Domino asked Bush how much he wanted for the arrangement. Bush figured that $1 a minute was pretty good, so he charged Fats $10. The song went on to sell over two million copies.

== Charts ==
Chart (1960)	Peak position
Belgium (Ultratop 50 Wallonia)	49
Netherlands (Single Top 100)	15
Norway (VG-lista)	9
UK Singles (OCC)	19
US Billboard Hot 100	6
US Hot R&B/Hip-Hop Songs (Billboard)	2

== Cover versions ==
- In 2007, Neil Young covered the song on the album Goin' Home: A Tribute to Fats Domino.

== Bibliography ==
- Blue Monday: Fats Domino and the Lost Dawn of Rock 'n' Roll, by Rick Coleman, Da Cappo Press, 2006, ISBN 978-0306815317
