= This Is Fats Domino! =

Studio album by Fats Domino
- Released: December 1956
- Recorded: 1951–1956
- Genre: Rock and roll
- Length: 27:11
- Label: Imperial
- Producer: Dave Bartholomew

Fats Domino chronology
Fats Domino Rock and Rollin' (1956)	This Is Fats Domino! (1956)	Here Stands Fats Domino (1957)

This Is Fats Domino! is the third album by R&B pianist and vocalist Fats Domino. The album was released by Imperial Records in December 1956.

== Release history ==
The album was released on Imperial Records, catalog LP-9028, in December 1956. The album was reissued in 1969 as stereo ("electronically re-recorded to simulate stereo", as printed on cover) by Liberty Records, the new owner of Imperial Records, with catalog LP-12389.

== Reception ==
The album is included in the reference book 1001 Albums You Must Hear Before You Die. The album sold more than 50,000 copies by February 1957.

== Track listing ==
Except where otherwise noted, all songs by Dave Bartholomew and Fats Domino.

1. "Blueberry Hill" (Vincent Rose, Al Lewis, Larry Stock) – 2:25
2. "Honey Chile" – 1:48
3. "What's the Reason I'm Not Pleasing You" (Pinky Tomlin, Earl Hatch, Coy Poe, Jimmy Grier) – 2:06
4. "Blue Monday" – 2:20
5. "So Long" – 2:16
6. "La-La" – 2:18
7. "Troubles of My Own" – 2:18
8. "You Done Me Wrong" – 2:06
9. "Reeling and Rocking" (Fats Domino, Alvin Young) – 2:18
10. "The Fat Man's Hop" (Fats Domino, Alvin Young) – 2:29
11. "Poor Poor Me" – 2:14
12. "Trust in Me" – 2:34

== Personnel ==
- Fats Domino – piano, vocals
- Cornelius Coleman – drums
- William Diamond – bass guitar
- Wendell DuConge – alto saxophone
- Lawrence Guyton – bass guitar
- Robert Hagans – tenor saxophone
- Herbert Hardesty – tenor saxophone
- Walter Nelson – guitar
