= Fats Domino Rock and Rollin' =

Studio album by Fats Domino
- Released: 1956
- Genre: Rock and roll
- Length: 28:08
- Language: English
- Label: Imperial

Fats Domino chronology
Rock and Rollin' with Fats Domino (1956)	Fats Domino Rock and Rollin' (1956)	This Is Fats Domino! (1956)

Fats Domino Rock and Rollin' is the second studio album by Fats Domino.

== Reception ==
Bruce Eder of AllMusic praised the album for "Fats' piano takes the spotlight on the rollicking 'Swanee River Hop', a genuine virtuoso performance at the ivories."

== Track listing ==
All tracks composed by Dave Bartholomew and Fats Domino, except where indicated

1. "My Blue Heaven" (Walter Donaldson, George A. Whiting) – 2:07
2. "Swanee River Hop" – 2:47
3. "Second Line Jump" – 2:33
4. "Goodbye" – 2:14
5. "Careless Love" (W.C. Handy, Martha E. Koenig, Spencer Williams) – 2:16
6. "I Love Her" – 2:06
7. "I'm in Love Again" – 1:56
8. "When My Dreamboat Comes Home" (D. Andrew Franklin, Cliff Friend) – 2:19
9. "Are You Going My Way" – 2:40
10. "If You Need Me" – 2:03
11. "My Heart Is in Your Hands" – 2:42
12. "Fat's Frenzy" – 2:25
