= Jewel King =

American rhythm and blues singer (1910 -1997)

Background information
- Birth name: Mary Jewel King
- Born: June 21, 1910 Texas, United States
- Died: November 25, 1997 (aged 87) San Antonio, Texas, U.S.
- Genres: R&B
- Occupation: Singer
- Years active: 1940s–1950s
- Labels: Imperial

Mary Jewel King (June 21, 1910 – November 25, 1997) was an American rhythm and blues singer in New Orleans.

== Biography ==
She is thought to have been born in Texas, and to have moved to New Orleans in the mid 1940s. Described as "an earthily unsophisticated singer", by 1948 she was popular in New Orleans clubs such as the Dew Drop Inn. Sax man Red Tyler, a member of Dave Bartholomew's Orchestra, remembered, "Jewel sang with us quite often. She was tall, attractive, and had a lot of stage presence. She worked real hard and was a good draw." She made some unissued recordings in 1948, and returned to record in November 1949 at Cosimo Matassa's studio. The session was produced by local bandleader Dave Bartholomew for Imperial Records, and was one of Bartholomew's first productions. Musicians included Bartholomew, Herb Hardesty, Red Tyler, Ernest McLean, Frank Fields, and Earl Palmer. One of the tracks recorded, "3 x 7 = 21", written by Bartholomew and with a saxophone solo by Tyler, became a hit, reaching number 4 on the Billboard R&B chart.

Imperial Records set up a tour for King, headlining over Fats Domino, who also had his first hit record at the time, but King withdrew at the last minute because her husband, Paul Gayten's guitarist Jack Scott, refused to let her tour with Bartholomew's band. Although Imperial released several further singles by King, they were not successful. She continued to tour in Texas and Oklahoma, and performed regularly with Scott's band, appearing in clubs in San Antonio, Texas, in the mid-1950s.

She died in San Antonio in 1997.
