= Bobby Mitchell (singer) =

American R&B singer and songwriter (1935–1989)

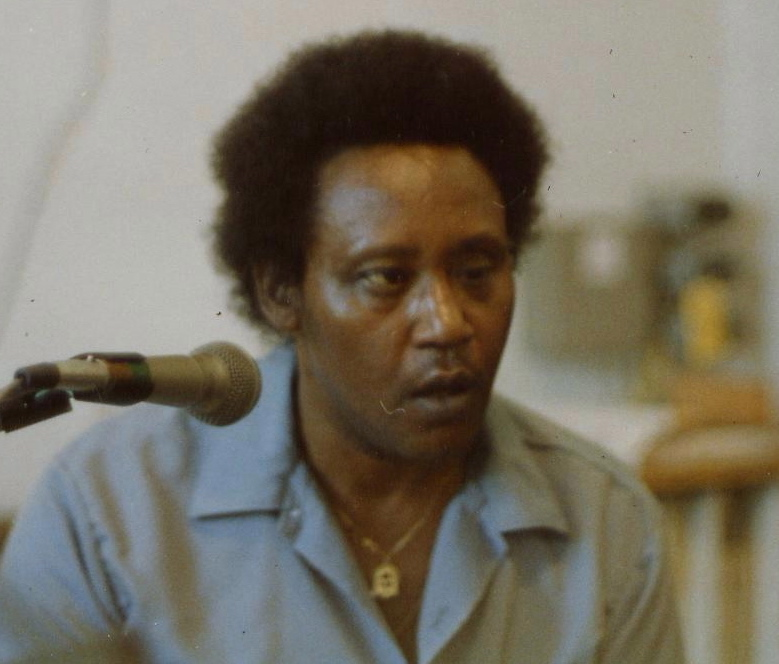
Mitchell at WWOZ, early 1980s

Bobby Mitchell (August 16, 1935 – March 17, 1989) was an American, New Orleans–based, rhythm & blues singer and songwriter.

Mitchell was born in the Algiers section of New Orleans. He was a popular recording artist in the 1950s and early 1960s, making records for Imperial Records, Show Biz Records and Rip Records. He first recorded in his teens with the doo-wop group "The Toppers", which was broken up as most of the members were drafted. Mitchell's single "Try Rock 'n Roll," hit the top 20 of the US Billboard R&B chart in 1956. Many of his sessions were arranged by Dave Bartholomew. His single "I'm Gonna Be a Wheel Someday" was a hit, pre dating the more famous cover of the tune by Fats Domino and got Mitchell an appearance on American Bandstand.

In the early 1980s he did radio shows at WWOZ.

Mitchell died in March 1989, at the age of 53, after years of health issues including diabetes, renal failure, and several heart attacks.
