= Alive and Kickin' (album) =

Studio album by Fats Domino
- Released: 2006
- Genre: R&B, rock and roll
- Label: tipitinasfoundation.org
- Producer: Fats Domino

Fats Domino chronology
Golden Legends: Fats Domino Live (2005)	Alive and Kickin' (2006)	Live from Austin TX (2006)

Alive and Kickin' is an album by the American musician Fats Domino, released in 2006. Proceeds from the album were directed to Tipitina's Foundation, an organization committed to preserving the musical culture and legacy of New Orleans. The album raised around $150,000 for the foundation in its first year of release.

Alive and Kickin' was Domino's final studio album. He had intended to support it by headlining the 2006 New Orleans Jazz & Heritage Festival, but had to cancel due to illness.

== Production ==
The album's 13 tracks were recorded at least six years before they were released. Much of the album was recorded at Ultrasonic Studios, New Orleans. The songs were written by Domino, aside from one by Bobby Charles and one by Floyd Tillman. Domino's backing band included saxophonist Herbert Hardesty and, from the Dirty Dozen Brass Band, saxophonist Roger Lewis.

== Critical reception ==
Professional ratings
Review scores
Source	Rating
Robert Christgau	A−
The Philadelphia Inquirer	3.5/4 stars
Rolling Stone	3.5/5 stars

Robert Christgau wrote: "Calm and meditative rather than playful and ebullient, this is a record only the most congenial of rock 'n' roll legends could have created." The New York Times stated that "the album mingles Mr. Domino's rolling New Orleans rhythm-and-blues piano and horns with touches of synthesizer or slide guitar ... His genial croon can sound close to country music." OffBeat deemed "One Step at a Time" "perhaps the best performance," calling it "a slow moaner ... right out of 1958."

The Philadelphia Inquirer noted that Domino "rolls with his usual aplomb through his trademark R&B and 'good-time rock-and-roll'." The Advocate concluded that "the sporadic substitution of synthesizer for horn solos and string sections is the only drawback about Alive and Kickin'." The Baltimore City Paper lamented that "there's no chemistry between the singer and the musicians, and the songs lack the rhythmic propulsion of Domino's classics," but acknowledged that the tracks "have the same infectious hooks of his early hits."

== Track listing ==
No.	Title	Length
1.	"Alive and Kickin'"
2.	"Love You Till the Day I Die"
3.	"I'll Be All Right"
4.	"I Spent All My Money Loving You"
5.	"Give Me Some"
6.	"One Step at a Time"
7.	"Home USA"
8.	"Every Night About This Time"
9.	"Four Leaf Clover"
10.	"It Makes No Difference Now"
11.	"This Is My Story"
12.	"You Made a Vow"
13.	"Ain't That a Shame 2000"
