= Whole Lotta Lovin' (Fats Domino song) =

Song by Fats Domino

from the album Fats Domino Swings
- B-side: "Coquette"
- Released: 1958
- Genre: R&B
- Length: 2:02
- Label: Imperial
- Songwriters: Fats Domino; Dave Bartholomew

Fats Domino singles chronology
"Young School Girl" (1958)	"Whole Lotta Lovin'" (1958)	"Telling Lies" (1959)

"Whole Lotta Lovin'" is a 1958 song by Fats Domino, written by Domino and Dave Bartholomew.

== Background ==
The record won an Imperial Gold Record Award. To promote the comeback single Fats appeared on The Dick Clark Beechnut Show on November 8, 1958, with singers the Kalin Twins, Andy Williams, and Gordon MacRae. The lyrics begin "I got a whole lotta lovin' for you, true true love for you".

== Chart performance ==
In the US, "Whole Lotta Lovin'" peaked at #2 on the Hot R&B Sides chart, and #6 on the Hot 100. The B-side to this recording was Fats Domino's version of "Coquette".

== Cover versions ==
The song was covered by:

- The Shakers (a cover name for Kingsize Taylor and the Dominoes) 1964
- A.C. Reed on Chief Records 1964
- Errol Dixon 1965
- In 1972, Hank Williams Jr. and Lois Johnson covered the song as "Whole Lotta Loving". This version peaked at #22 on the Hot Country Singles chart.
- Jean Steakley 1972
- Professor Longhair on the album Crawfish Fiesta 1979
- Blake Xolton (Martian Records/Dan Kessel) 1981
- Bobby Moore, a Belgian singer 1986
- Trombone Shorty and Lenny Kravitz on the album Goin' Home: A Tribute to Fats Domino 2007
- Tiny Morrie, a Spanish version entitled "Te Voy A Dar Mis Amores" in the 1970s.
