= Goin' Home (Fats Domino song) =

Single by Fats Domino
- B-side: "Reeling and Rocking"
- Released: March 1952
- Recorded: New Orleans, January 1952
- Genre: New Orleans R&B
- Length: 2:15
- Label: Imperial
- Songwriters: Fats Domino, Alvin E. Young
- Producer: Alvin Young

Fats Domino singles chronology
"I'll Be Gone" (1952)	"Goin' Home" (1952)	"Poor Poor Me" (1952)

"Goin' Home" is a song written by Fats Domino and Imperial Records producer Alvin Young. It was recorded by Domino in January 1952 and issued as a single by Imperial in March of that year. After debuting on April 26, 1952, the single reached No. 1 on the U.S. Billboard Best Selling Rhythm & Blues Records chart and became his first to top the record charts.

"Goin' Home" also reached No. 3 on Billboard's Most Played Juke Box Rhythm & Blues Records chart, and No. 30 on its broader Hot 100. Chart compiler Joel Whitburn identifies the single as "a reported million seller". In March 1956, "Goin' Home" was included on Domino's first compilation album, Rock and Rollin' with Fats Domino.
