= Valley of Tears (song) =

Single by Fats Domino

from the album This is Fats
- B-side: "It's You I Love"
- Released: April 1957
- Recorded: March 7, 1957
- Genre: New Orleans R&B
- Length: 1:56
- Label: Imperial
- Songwriters: Fats Domino; Dave Bartholomew

Fats Domino singles chronology
"I'm Walkin'" (1957)	"Valley of Tears" (1957)	"When I See You" (1957)

"Valley of Tears" is a song written by Fats Domino and Dave Bartholomew and performed by Fats Domino. In April 1957, it was released as single by Imperial Records and reached No. 2 on Billboard's R&B chart and No. 8 on its broader Hot 100. The single's B-side, "It's You I Love", reached No. 6 on the Hot 100 in 1957. Both songs are included on his 1957 album This is Fats.

== Versions of the Song by Other Artists ==
Roots Reggae chanter Bim Sherman recorded two versions of the song, the first released in 1975, backed by Soul Syndicate at Channel One Studios featuring Earl Chinna Smith and most likely mixed by either King Tubby or Pat Kelly, the second version, released in 1990 on his own Century label.

Buddy Holly cut a version of the tune in 1957, released on his debut album in 1958.

Brook Benton released his take on the song in 1962 on his album Brook Benton Singing The Blues.
