= I'm Walkin' =

1957 song by Fats Domino

Single by Fats Domino

from the album Here Stands Fats Domino
- B-side: "I'm in the Mood for Love"
- Released: February 23, 1957
- Recorded: January 3, 1957
- Studio: Cosimo (New Orleans, Lousisiana)
- Genre: Rock and roll
- Length: 2:05
- Label: Imperial
- Songwriters: Fats Domino, Dave Bartholomew

Fats Domino singles chronology
"Blue Monday" (1956)	"I'm Walkin'" (1957)	"Valley of Tears" (1957)

"I'm Walkin'" is a 1957 song by Fats Domino, written with frequent collaborator Dave Bartholomew. The single was Domino's third release in a row to reach No. 1 on the R&B Best Sellers chart, where it stayed for six weeks. It also broadened the singer's crossover appeal, peaking at No. 4 on the pop singles chart. The prominent saxophone solo was played by Herbert Hardesty. Lee Allen was also on sax, Frank Fields on bass, Earl Palmer on drums, and Walter "Papoose" Nelson on guitar.

In 2019, the 1957 recording by Domino on Imperial Records was inducted into the Grammy Hall of Fame.

== Other versions ==
Later in 1957, American musician Ricky Nelson covered a crossover version of the song on an episode of The Adventures of Ozzie & Harriet; the single was released on Verve Records and reached No. 4 on the pop chart and No. 10 on the R&B chart. Its B-side was "A Teenager's Romance". After several Verve singles, Nelson also recorded for Imperial Records, the same label Domino was on at the time.

On February 25, 1972, Jerry Lee Lewis recorded a breakneck version for his album The Killer Rocks On.

In 1975, J. D. Crowe and The New South covered the song on their 1975 eponymous release.
