= Lew Chudd =

American record label and radio executive

- Born: Louis Cudnofsky; July 11, 1911; Toronto, Ontario, Canada
- Died: June 15, 1998 (aged 86); Los Angeles, California, United States
- Citizenship: American
- Occupations: Music industry executive, radio station owner
- Known for: Founding Imperial Records

Lewis Robert Chudd (July 11, 1911 – June 15, 1998) was an American record label and radio executive who founded Imperial Records in 1946. The record company was influential in the development of rock and roll, with a roster of musicians including Fats Domino, Slim Whitman, Chris Kenner, Sandy Nelson, and Ricky Nelson.

== Biography ==
Chudd was born Louis Chudnofsky in Toronto, Canada, the son of Russian Jewish immigrants. He grew up in Harlem, New York, and after (in his own words) "skipp[ing] college and... loafing for four years" – although on other occasions he claimed to be a university graduate – joined NBC as an advertising salesman in 1934. He promoted swing bands and created the radio program Let's Dance, featuring Benny Goodman, before moving to head the corporation's bureau in Los Angeles. During World War II he worked for the Office of War Information, where he produced radio programmes, and became a naturalized US citizen in 1943.

In 1945, he set up his first record label, Crown, to record jazz. He sold the label the following year, and established Imperial Records, which he initially saw as targeting the growing black and Hispanic record-buying markets in Southern California. He recorded various jump blues musicians and Mexican artists, including Los Madrugadores and Lalo Guerrero. After diversifying into such genres as square dancing and Dixieland jazz, in 1947 he met the bandleader Dave Bartholomew, who became his A&R man and record producer in New Orleans. Bartholomew introduced Chudd to a young pianist, Fats Domino, and Chudd signed Domino to Imperial. The company's first national hits, Domino's "The Fat Man" and "3 x 7 = 21" by singer Jewel King, soon followed, in 1950. Bartholomew left Imperial after a disagreement with Chudd at the end of 1950, though they were later reconciled. Imperial had a series of hits in the early 1950s, many by Fats Domino, and others by the R&B musicians Roy Brown, Smiley Lewis, Chris Kenner, and Ernie Freeman; blues musicians Smokey Hogg, T-Bone Walker, and Lightnin' Hopkins; and country singer Slim Whitman. Chudd signed Ricky Nelson, the star of the television series The Adventures of Ozzie and Harriet, to Imperial in 1957, and the singer had a succession of hits through the early 1960s. The label also had hits with records by Sandy Nelson and Frankie Ford.

A "shrewd and astute businessman", Chudd became known for his "caustic tongue and abrasive personality." He bought other record labels, including Aladdin and Minit, incorporating them into Imperial. In 1963 he sold the Imperial label to Liberty Records. The label was discontinued later in the 1960s and incorporated into United Artists.

After leaving the recording business, Chudd bought several radio stations. He continued to live in Los Angeles after he retired. He died there of heart failure in 1998, aged 86.
