= Going to the River =

Single by Fats Domino
- B-side: "Mardi Gras in New Orleans"
- Released: March 1953
- Genre: Rock and roll
- Length: 2:28
- Label: Imperial
- Songwriter(s): Dave Bartholomew, Fats Domino

Fats Domino singles chronology
"Nobody Loves Me" (1953)	"Going to the River" (1953)	"Please Don't Leave Me" (1953)

"Going to the River" is a song written by Dave Bartholomew and Fats Domino and performed by Fats Domino. In 1953, it reached No. 2 on the U.S. R&B chart. The song is included on his 1956 compilation album, Rock and Rollin' with Fats Domino.

In 1953, Chuck Willis released a version of the song as a single that reached No. 4 on the U.S. R&B chart.
