= Herbert Hardesty =

American musician and Tuskegee Airman (1925–2016)

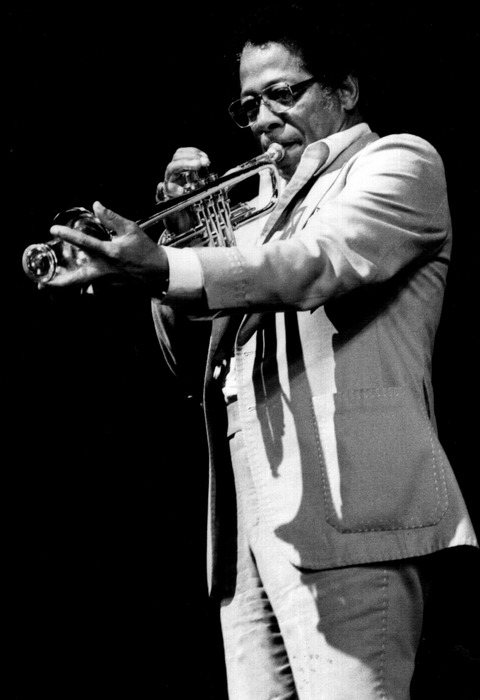
- Hardesty in 1980

Background information
- Born: March 3, 1925; New Orleans, Louisiana, U.S.
- Died: December 3, 2016 (aged 91) Las Vegas, Nevada, U.S.
- Genres: Jazz
- Instrument(s): Tenor saxophone, trumpet
- Years active: 1939–2016

Herbert Hardesty (March 3, 1925 – December 3, 2016) was an American musician who played tenor saxophone and trumpet. He is best known for his association with the New Orleans pianist Fats Domino and the producer Dave Bartholomew, beginning in 1948. He released six 45-rpm records as Herb Hardesty between 1959 and 1962. His first CD of these recordings, together with others made but not issued in 1958, were released worldwide in July 2012 by Ace Records (United Kingdom) as The Domino Effect.

== Early life ==
Hardesty was born in New Orleans, Louisiana, on March 3, 1925. He began trumpet lessons in school at the age of six and used a trumpet given to his stepfather by Louis Armstrong. He also took lessons from Professor Valmore Victor and began playing in a local Works Progress Administration big band. By 1939, he was getting paid to play with bands led by Papa Celestin, Sidney Desvigne, and others. Chick Webb also asked him to perform with his orchestra.

Hardesty enlisted in the military in 1941 even though he was two years below the minimum draft age. At the United States Army Air Corps base in Jackson, Mississippi, he volunteered to play saxophone in the band, and his commanding officer purchased an alto saxophone, which Hardesty learned to play in two days. His Army training continued at Tuskegee, Alabama, and he was a radio technician in the 99th Flying Training Squadron, stationed in Morocco, Italy, and Germany, making him part of what is now known as the Tuskegee Airmen. When time permitted he played trumpet and alto saxophone with local European musicians. After the war ended, Hardesty returned to New Orleans and attended Dillard University.

== Early career ==
His first trio performed at the Hurricane Bar (3726 S. Claiborne Avenue, in New Orleans, a few blocks from where he was living) with Hardesty playing double bass accompanied by a guitarist and pianist, similar to Nat King Cole's group. Shortly after this Hardesty purchased a tenor saxophone and began taking lessons, and by 1948 formed a group, the Four Dukes, which performed at Club Desire in New Orleans; Hardesty played trumpet and tenor sax.

Hardesty met Dave Bartholomew in 1946, and by January 1949 Bartholomew asked Hardesty to go into the studio to record with Chubby Newsom for De Luxe Records, for the album New Orleans Lover Man. Other musicians on this session included the drummer Earl Palmer, the bassist Frank Fields, the guitarist Ernest McLean, who together with Bartholomew and Hardesty (by this time primarily playing tenor sax) were the core of the studio band which during the 1950s recorded many hit records at Cosimo Matassa's J&M Recording Studio. Later in 1949, Hardesty toured for about six months with the singer Roy Brown.

Upon returning to New Orleans, Hardesty again recorded with Bartholomew, including the November 29, 1949, sessions for Jewel King ("3 x 7 = 21") and Tommy Ridgley ("Shrewsbury Blues"). On December 10, 1949, he recorded on "The Fat Man" with Fats Domino, the first release for the future Rock and Roll Hall of Fame member. During the first half of the 1950s, Hardesty continued to do studio work with Domino and other artists, including Lloyd Price (Hardesty contributed the saxophone solo on "Lawdy Miss Clawdy"), Shirley and Lee, Smiley Lewis, T-Bone Walker, Big Joe Turner, Little Richard, and others, and occasionally performed in local clubs. In 1953, he helped Ray Charles organize and rehearse a band for a tour.

== Touring with Fats Domino and solo recordings ==
In 1955, Bartholomew asked Hardesty to begin touring with Fats Domino. When the band played at the 5-4 Ballroom in Los Angeles, California, in March 1955, a photographer took a picture of Hardesty playing tenor sax on his back, and it appeared in the April 18, 1955, issue of Life magazine, the first time that Domino was mentioned in Life, although he was not in the photograph. This same trip to Los Angeles also included recording sessions that resulted in hits for Domino, including "Blue Monday", on which Hardesty played the baritone saxophone solo because the other musician was unable to get the right sound; it was the first and only time that Hardesty played baritone sax. One music writer said this solo "is as close to perfection as one can imagine. The eight-bar sax break is a gem of almost frightening economy. It is one of the most memorable, bluesy, and yet simple runs in all of r&b." Other well-known tenor saxophone solos by Hardesty with Domino were on "I'm Walkin'", "Ain't That a Shame", and "Let the Four Winds Blow".

Hardesty's solo recordings began in 1957; the first two, organized by the guitarist Mickey Baker, were never released are not known to exist. Twelve songs were recorded on January 15, 1958, at Cosimo Matassa's studio in New Orleans for Wing Records, a subsidiary of Mercury Records, but were never released until the 2012 CD The Domino Effect was issued worldwide by Ace Records (United Kingdom). The first time that Hardesty's name appeared on a single was with the Canadian vocal quartet the Diamonds, "Don't Let Me Down" (also known as "Chick-Lets"), which was recorded on March 4, 1958, and released the following month as Mercury 71291. In 1959, Hardesty recorded four tracks in New York City with Hank Jones. Two were released as a single on Paoli, the only release from this label; they were also released shortly after by Mutual, both labels having connections to Philadelphia. The Mutual release was listed on Philadelphia radio station WIBG's Future Forty chart for November 2, 1959, but did not chart elsewhere. The four tracks were purchased by King Records in 1961 and were re-released as two 45s by Federal Records in April and June 1961. Hardesty recorded four more songs in October 1961, which were released in 1962 by Federal; two are not instrumentals and had vocals by the New Orleans guitarist Walter "Papoose" Nelson. Hardesty co-wrote the title track of Fats Domino's 1964 album, Fats on Fire.

== Association with other musicians ==
Hardesty continued to tour with Domino until 1971, when he moved to Las Vegas. In 1973, he played trumpet with the Duke Ellington Orchestra at the Hilton Hotel in Las Vegas and was a member of the Count Basie Orchestra for six months, playing tenor saxophone. He became a member of the house band at the Hilton Hotel and backed vocalists including Tony Bennett, Ella Fitzgerald, and Frank Sinatra.

In 1978, the drummer Earl Palmer invited Hardesty to record with Tom Waits for the album Blue Valentine. He was a member of Waits's quartet in 1978 and 1979, touring in the United States, Europe and Australia. He played more trumpet than tenor sax. CDs and DVDs of the Waits shows in Austin, Texas, are available.

Hardesty rejoined Domino from about 1980 until 2005 and can be heard on numerous live recordings released during these years. He played tenor sax on Dr. John's 1992 album Goin' Back to New Orleans. Over the years Hardesty performed in Europe and privately issued a CD recorded in Germany with the Olaf Polziehn Trio. He also appeared at the Ascona Jazz Festival with the tenor saxophonist Plas Johnson. He recorded with the pianist Mitch Woods for the albums Big Easy Boogie, released in 2006 (followed by a European tour in 2008), and Gumbo Blues, released in 2010. Hardesty continued to perform with Dr. John at the New Orleans Jazz & Heritage Festival. Reviewing his solos at the 2012 festival, the newspaper Gambit wrote: "All hail Herb Hardesty, one of the few remaining alums of the J&M Studio Band whose talents helped create so many hits and classic songs for Fats Domino, Little Richard, Shirley and Lee, and so many others. His presence and fine soloing in Dr. John's sets this Jazz Fest added to the New Orleans feel in Dr. John's new songs." He led his own group, Herb Hardesty & The Dukes, on April 28, 2013, in the Blues tent at the New Orleans Jazz & Heritage Festival. Hardesty continued to perform in Las Vegas. He died of cancer there on December 3, 2016, at the age of 91.

== Instruments played ==
For most of his career, Hardesty played a gold-plated Selmer Mark VI tenor saxophone with an Otto Link mouthpiece. His trumpet was custom-made by Henri Selmer Paris, one of two made in France by a master craftsman; the other was owned by Louis Armstrong.

== Discography ==
=== Herb Hardesty ===
==== Singles ====
- Paoli 1001, "Beatin' and Blowin'" b/w "Perdido Street"
- Mutual 1001, "Beatin' and Blowin'" b/w "Perdido Street"
- Federal 12410, "Beatin' and Blowin'" b/w "69 Mother's Place"
- Federal 12423, "Perdido Street" b/w "Adam and Eva" (the correct title is "Adam and Eve")
- Federal 12444, "Just a Little Bit of Everything" b/w "It Must Be Wonderful"
- Federal 12460, "The Chicken Twist" b/w "Why Did We Have To Part"

==== Compilation album ====
- Ace CDTOP 1333, The Domino Effect: Wing and Federal Recordings 1958–61

=== The Diamonds with Herb Hardesty and His Orchestra ===
==== Singles ====
- Mercury 71291, "Chick-Lets" (also known as "Don't Let Me Down")

==== Compilation album ====
- King LP 771, Just a Little Bit of Everything, with James Brown and four other groups
