= Smiley Lewis =

American R&B singer and guitarist (1913–1966)

Background information
- Also known as: Smiling Lewis
- Born: Overton Amos Lemons; July 5, 1913; DeQuincy, Louisiana, U.S.
- Died: October 7, 1966 (aged 53) New Orleans, Louisiana, U.S.
- Genres: Blues, New Orleans R&B
- Occupations: Musician, songwriter
- Instruments: Vocals, guitar
- Years active: 1930s–1960s

Overton Amos Lemons (July 5, 1913 – October 7, 1966), known as Smiley Lewis, was an American New Orleans rhythm and blues singer and guitarist. The music journalist Tony Russell wrote that "Lewis was the unluckiest man in New Orleans. He hit on a formula for slow-rocking, small-band numbers like 'The Bells Are Ringing' and 'I Hear You Knocking' only to have Fats Domino come up behind him with similar music with a more ingratiating delivery. Lewis was practically drowned in Domino's backwash."

== Life and career ==
Lemons was born in DeQuincy, Louisiana, a rural hamlet near Lake Charles, to Jeffrey and Lillie Mae Lemons. He was the second of three sons. His mother died while he was a child, and later he named a song and several automobiles after her. In his mid-teens, he hopped a slow-moving freight train with some friends, who jumped off when the train began to speed up. Lewis alone remained on the train, getting off when it reached its stop in New Orleans. He found boarding with a white family in the Irish Channel neighborhood and eventually adopted their surname, Lewis.

He began playing clubs in the French Quarter and integrated "tan bars" in the Seventh Ward, at times billed as Smiling Lewis, a variation of the nickname earned by his lack of front teeth. He was often accompanied by the pianist Isidore "Tuts" Washington, with whom he played in Thomas Jefferson's Dixieland band in the mid-1930s. When the band dissolved, Lewis began playing in clubs, earning only tips.

Lewis married Leona Robinson in 1938. The couple lived with her mother until they began having children, when they moved to South Tonti Street, while Lewis worked at manual labor during the day and performed at night. During World War II, he joined Washington again, this time with Kid Ernest Molière's band, entertaining soldiers stationed at Fort Polk, outside Leesville, Louisiana, and serving as the house band at the Boogie Woogie Club. The two formed a trio with the drummer Herman Seals after the war ended and again began playing in clubs in the French Quarter and along Bourbon Street.

The trio was invited by David Braun to record a session for his DeLuxe Records in 1947, which produced Lewis's debut record, "Here Comes Smiley" (Papa John Joseph replaced Seals and played bass at this session). The single "Turn On Your Volume" was a local jukebox hit, but DeLuxe requested no more material and left two other recorded sides unreleased. An invitation from Dave Bartholomew, who grew up in the same neighborhood as Lewis and was then beginning a career as a producer with Imperial Records, led to a recording session for the trio in March 1950, at which they recorded the song "Tee Nah Nah". Lewis had his first national hit song with "The Bells Are Ringing" in 1952. He was the first to record Bartholomew's song "Blue Monday", in 1954; Fats Domino's recording of the song was a hit two years later. In 1955 he achieved his biggest sales with "I Hear You Knocking", the first recording of the song (written by Bartholomew and Pearl King), with Huey Smith playing the piano.

In an attempt prompted by Imperial Records president Lew Chudd to attract new record buyers in 1957, Lewis recorded pop and country songs. The experiment failed and did nothing to boost Lewis's declining record sales, and he was released from the label. In the early 1960s he performed as an opening act for new performers, including Lee Dorsey, Irma Thomas, and Ernie K-Doe, for which he was paid little; he arrived at gigs by taking a city bus. His career rounded out with a brief stint at Okeh Records in 1961 that consisted of one 45-rpm single, produced by Bill "Hoss" Allen in 1964 for Dot Records, and ended with a re-recording of "The Bells Are Ringing" for Loma Records, produced by Allen Toussaint.

== Death ==
Lewis was hospitalized in 1965 with a diagnosis of ulcer; surgery revealed that he had stomach cancer. Bartholomew organized a benefit for him at La Ray's on Dryades Street. On October 7, 1966, three days before the benefit, Lewis died, in the arms of his second wife, Dorothy Ester Lemons, whom he had married six months before.

== Legacy ==
None of Lewis's Imperial singles sold more than 100,000 copies, but cover versions of his songs were commercially successful for other artists. Gale Storm's pop version of "I Hear You Knocking" reached the top five on the charts.

Elvis Presley's cover of the Lewis song "One Night" (altering the ‘risqué’ lyrics) was number 4 on the U.S. Billboard Hot 100 chart and number 1 on UK Singles Chart. Lewis's recording of "I Hear You Knocking" was released when U.S. radio was still mostly marketed to exclusively white or exclusively black listeners. A version of the song recorded by Dave Edmunds in 1970 was his first solo hit, reaching number one in the UK and number four in the United States; in this version, Lewis is mentioned in the lyrics, along with Chuck Berry, Fats Domino and Huey Smith.

Lewis's recording of "Shame, Shame, Shame" was used in the soundtrack of the film Baby Doll in 1956, accompanying a dramatic chase through a collapsing attic. The song failed to enter the R&B chart. It was covered by the Merseybeats for their EP On Stage in 1964. Aerosmith included it on their blues album, Honkin' on Bobo, released in 2004. The song also provided the title of the fifth episode of the HBO television series Treme, which included a rewritten version of the song with lyrics critical of the government's response to Hurricane Katrina.

A short clip from "I Hear You Knocking" is included on Buchanan and Goodman's novelty hit, "The Flying Saucer", in which, in an ironic nod to his original stage name, Lewis is referred to as "Laughing Lewis." In 2019, "I Hear You Knocking" as recorded by Lewis, appeared in Martin Scorsese's epic-crime-drama The Irishman and is also present on its respective soundtrack album.

== Key recordings ==
- "Tee-Nah-Nah" (1950), Imperial Records
- "The Bells Are Ringing" (1952), Imperial
- "Blue Monday" (1954), Imperial
- "(I Love You) For Sentimental Reasons" (1954), Imperial
- "I Hear You Knocking" (1955), US Billboard R&B chart number 2
- "One Night (Of Sin)" (1956), Imperial, R&B number 11
- "Please Listen to Me" (1956), Imperial, R&B number 9
- "Shame, Shame, Shame" (1957), Imperial
- "The Bells Are Ringing" (re-recording) (1965), Loma

== See also ==
- List of New Orleans blues musicians
