= The Fat Man (song) =

1949 song by Fats Domino

Single by Fats Domino
- B-side: "Detroit City Blues"
- Released: December 1949
- Recorded: December 10, 1949
- Studio: J&M (New Orleans, Louisiana)
- Genre: Rhythm and blues; rock and roll
- Length: 2:35
- Label: Imperial
- Songwriters: Fats Domino, Dave Bartholomew

Fats Domino singles chronology
"The Fat Man" (1949)	"Boogie-Woogie Baby" (1950)

"The Fat Man" is a song by American rhythm and blues recording artist Fats Domino. It was written by Domino and Dave Bartholomew, and recorded on December 10, 1949. It is often cited as one of the first rock and roll records or at least a strong influence on the genre. This was a "rollicking" song, according to The Guardian, "but what made it a rocker was Fats's barrelling piano triplets, combined with a solid big beat".

The recording is one of four Fats Domino songs to have been named to the Grammy Hall of Fame. Domino received a Grammy Lifetime Achievement Award in 1987.

== Recording ==
The song was recorded for Imperial Records in Cosimo Matassa's J&M Recording Studio on Rampart Street in New Orleans, Louisiana on Saturday, December 10, 1949. Imperial's Lew Chudd had previously asked Dave Bartholomew to show him some locally popular talent, and was most impressed with the 21-year-old Fats Domino, then playing at a working class dive in the 9th Ward of New Orleans.

Domino sang and played piano, along with Earl Palmer on drums, Frank Fields on string bass, Ernest McLean on guitar, and sax players Herbert Hardesty, Clarence Hall, Joe Harris, and Red Tyler. The aluminum (or lacquer) master disc recording has been missing for over 50 years. Today's masters come from well-preserved 78 RPM copies.

== Music and lyrics ==
The tune is a variation on the traditional New Orleans tune "Junker Blues", as played by Willie Hall (known as "Drive'em Down"), which also provided the melody for Lloyd Price's "Lawdy Miss Clawdy," and Professor Longhair's "Tipitina". "The Fat Man" features Domino's piano with a distinct back beat that dominates both the lead and the rhythm section. Earl Palmer said it was the first time a drummer played nothing but back beat for recording, which he said he derived from a Dixieland "out chorus." Domino also scats a pair of choruses in a distinctive wah-wah falsetto, creating a variation on the lead similar to a muted Dixieland trumpet or a harmonica.

They call, they call me the fat man
´Cause I weigh 200 pounds:
All the girls they love me
´Cause I know my way around

The lyrics refer to watching Creole women at the intersection of Rampart Street and Canal Street, which at the time were the business centers of the city's African American and Caucasian populations, respectively.

== Personnel ==
- Fats Domino – piano, vocals
- Earl Palmer – drums
- Frank Fields – string bass
- Ernest McLean – guitar
- Herbert Hardesty – saxophone
- Clarence Hall – saxophone
- Joe Harris – saxophone
- Red Tyler – saxophone

== Release and reception ==
"The Fat Man" was released in December 1949 by Imperial Records right before Christmas and began to gain national attention in January 1950, and on February 18, it reached number two on the R&B Singles chart. It was Domino's debut single, the B-side being "Detroit City Blues". Imperial advertising claimed it sold 10,000 copies in New Orleans in 10 days, and the record became a national hit in late January 1950. In 1956, "The Fat Man" was included on Fats Domino's debut album as the opening track.

"The Fat Man" is often cited as one of the first rock and roll records. Musicologist Ned Sublette said that the song was rock and roll before the term had been coined and that Domino crossed a line by playing a stripped-down, more aggressive boogie-woogie piano with a series of "piano-triplet-and-snare-backbeat hits." According to Biography.com, it "became the first rock 'n' roll record to sell 1 million copies".

The artist was not convinced that his work was of a new genre. Years later, in 1956, he made this comment: "What they call rock and roll is rhythm and blues, and I've been playing it for 15 years in New Orleans."
