= Fats Pichon =

American American jazz pianist and bandleader (1906–1967)

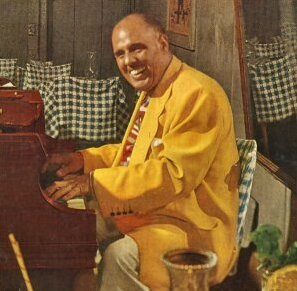
- Fats Pichon playing at the Old Absinthe House, 1950s

Background information
- Born: Walter Gabriel Pichon; April 3, 1906; New Orleans, Louisiana, United States
- Died: February 25, 1967 (aged 60) Chicago, Illinois, U.S.
- Genres: Jazz
- Occupations: Singer, pianist
- Instruments: Vocals, piano

Walter Gabriel Pichon (April 3, 1906 – February 25, 1967) professionally known as Fats Pichon, was an American jazz pianist, singer, bandleader, and songwriter.

== Biography ==
Pichon was born and raised in New Orleans, Louisiana, and began playing piano in his childhood. He also played baritone horn in brass bands in his youth, already a professional musician by 1920.

He first went north about 1922, playing at various venues in New York City and New Jersey before settling in Boston for a few years where he studied at the New England Conservatory of Music. After touring the United States and Mexico with various bands in the mid-1920s, he settled again in his hometown of New Orleans for the later part of the decade, leading bands under his own name at dance halls and on river boats on the Mississippi River. On visits back to New York he made some recordings, mostly as a vocalist on novelty numbers, with Luis Russell and other New Orleans groups.

In the 1930s, Fats Pichon led what some considered the best big band in New Orleans; it also made Mississippi Riverboat excursions. Musicians included young Dave Bartholomew. This band never recorded. In the 1940s he began a long gig as the house pianist at The Old Absinthe House, a popular venue on Bourbon Street in the French Quarter, where he remained until about 1960, with occasional tours of other parts of the U.S., Latin America, and the Caribbean. Pichon moved into the role of Eddie the Waiter, replacing comedian Eddie Green on the NBC weekly radio comedy Duffy's Tavern during the show's last season, 1950–1951. After several episodes the waiter's name was changed from 'Eddie' to 'Fats'.

He died in Chicago in 1967, aged 60.

== See also ==
- Lionel Ferbos
