= One Night (Smiley Lewis song) =

1956 song

"One Night" is a song written by Dave Bartholomew and Pearl King. It was originally recorded by Smiley Lewis for Imperial Records in 1956. On some releases, the song is titled "One Night of Sin", in line with the original lyrics. The single reached No. 11 on the Billboard R&B chart in early 1956. The song gained greater commercial success in a version released by Elvis Presley in 1958, with the addition of co-writer Anita Steiman (or Steinman), due to some rewritten lyrics.

== Elvis Presley version ==
"One Night"

Single by Elvis Presley
- B-side: "I Got Stung"
- Released: October 21, 1958
- Recorded: February 23, 1957
- Studio: Radio Recorders, Hollywood
- Genre: R&B; rock and roll
- Length: 2:32
- Label: RCA Victor
- Songwriters: Dave Bartholomew, Pearl King, Anita Steinman

Elvis Presley singles chronology
"Hard Headed Woman" (1958)	"One Night" (1958)	"I Need Your Love Tonight" (1959)

Elvis Presley recorded a version of the song with its original lyrics on January 18, 1957, but this version would not be released until 1983 on the album Elvis: A Legendary Performer, Volume 4. Both Elvis' manager and record company had reservations about the suggestive lyrics. Elvis did not give up on the song. He continued to play with it during his spare time on the set of Loving You, finally rewriting the lyrics that he felt were holding the song captive, changing "One night of sin is what I'm now paying for" into "One night with you is what I'm now praying for." Presley's recording credited Anita Steinman as an additional co-writer, with Bartholomew and King.

On February 23, 1957, at Radio Recorders in Los Angeles, he showed up with his new lyrics, feeling sure they would meet his label's approval. It was issued as a single in October 1958 and peaked at No. 4 on Billboard's singles chart. The song was published by Elvis Presley Music.

Presley's recording was issued as a double A-side with "I Got Stung", and reached number one twice on the UK Singles Chart. In the US, "One Night" reached number four on the pop singles chart and number ten on the R&B chart. The song became the UK's 1000th number-one single upon its second release in January 2005. It was also his last single to be issued on 78 RPM records in the United States. On February 12, 1959, it became the first song to reach No. 1 on the Irish Music Charts Top 10, when they were being printed in the Evening Herald. It spent one week at the top spot.

Rock critic Pete Johnson observed that the song contains a triple negative with the lyrics "I ain't never did no wrong".

Personnel

- Elvis Presley, lead guitar, vocals
- Scotty Moore, guitar
- Bill Black, bass
- D.J. Fontana, drums
- Dudley Brooks, piano
- The Jordanaires, vocals
