= Dave Bartholomew =

American musician, producer, and composer (1918–2019)

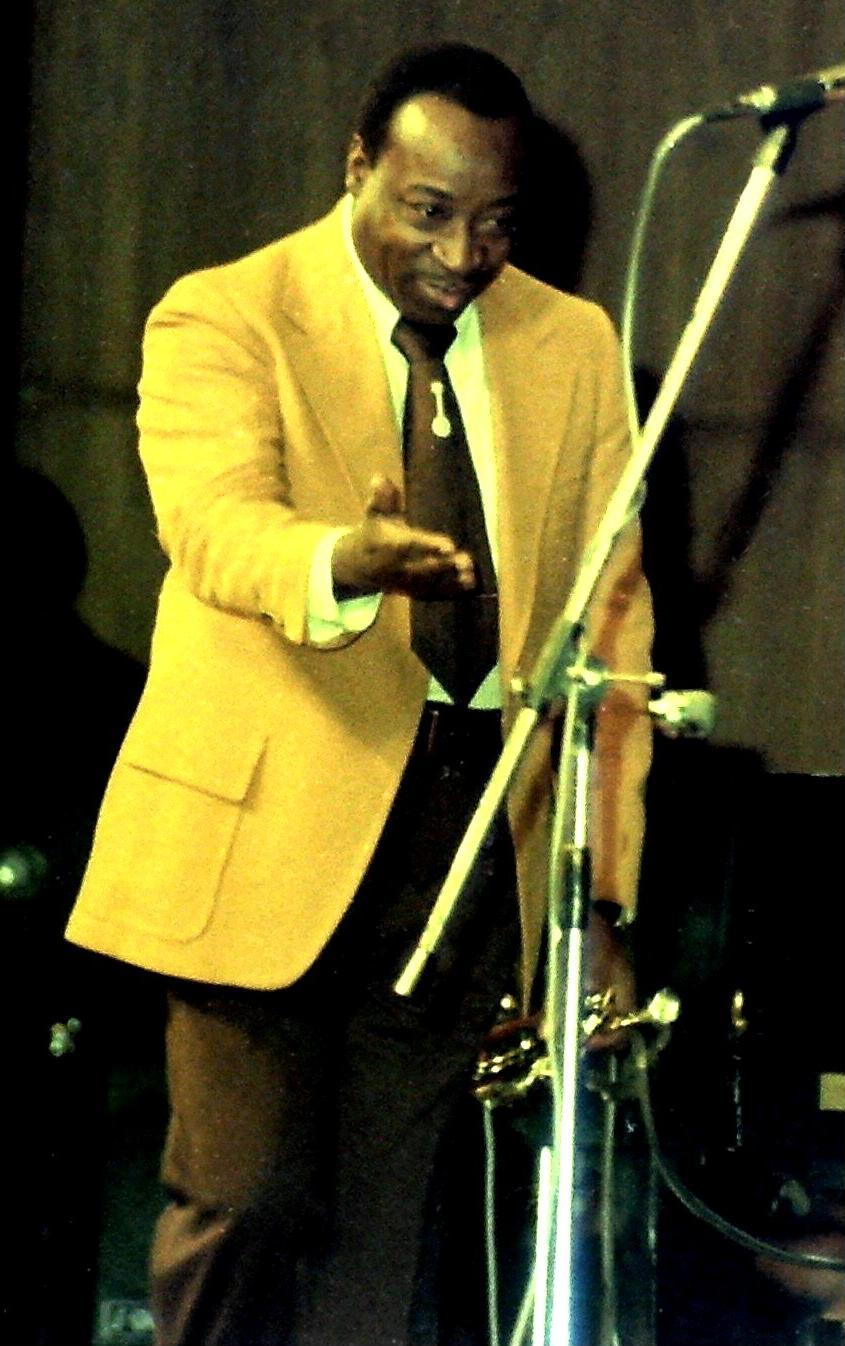
- Bartholomew in 1977

Background information
- Also known as: David Louis Bartholomew
- Born: Davis Bartholomew; December 24, 1918; Edgard, Louisiana, U.S.
- Died: June 23, 2019 (aged 100) Metairie, Louisiana, U.S.
- Genres: Rhythm and blues, big band, swing, rock and roll, Dixieland
- Occupations: Musician, bandleader, composer, arranger
- Instruments: Trumpet, tuba
- Years active: 1936–2019
- Labels: De Luxe, Imperial, Broadmoor
- Military career
- Allegiance: United States
- Branch: United States Army
- Service years: 1940–1945
- Conflicts: World War II

David Louis Bartholomew (December 24, 1918 – June 23, 2019) was an American musician, bandleader, composer, arranger, and record producer. He was prominent in the music of New Orleans throughout the second half of the 20th century. Originally a trumpeter, he was active in many musical genres, including rhythm and blues (R&B), big band, swing music, rock and roll, New Orleans jazz, and Dixieland. In his induction into the Rock and Roll Hall of Fame, he was cited as a key figure in the transition from jump blues and swing to R&B and as "one of the Crescent City's greatest musicians and a true pioneer in the rock and roll revolution".

Many musicians have recorded Bartholomew's songs, but his partnership with Fats Domino produced some of his greatest successes. In the mid-1950s, they wrote more than 40 hits for Imperial Records, including the Billboard number-one pop chart hit "Ain't That a Shame". Bartholomew's other hit songs as a composer include "I Hear You Knocking", "Blue Monday", "I'm Walkin'", "My Ding-a-Ling", and "One Night". He was a member of the Songwriters Hall of Fame, the Rock and Roll Hall of Fame, and the Louisiana Music Hall of Fame.

== Biography ==
=== Early life ===
He was born Davis Bartholomew on December 24, 1918, in Edgard, Louisiana, to Mary and Louis Bartholomew. He learned to play his father's preferred instrument, the tuba, then took up the trumpet, taught to him by Peter Davis, who had also tutored Louis Armstrong. Around 1933, Bartholomew moved with his parents to New Orleans, where he played in local jazz and brass bands, including Papa Celestin's, as well as Fats Pichon's band on a Mississippi riverboat. He took charge of Pichon's band in 1941, and after a stay in Jimmie Lunceford's band, joined the US Army during World War II. He developed writing and arranging skills as a member of the 196th Army Ground Forces Band.

=== Early music career ===
At the end of the war, Bartholomew returned to New Orleans, and by November 1945, had started leading his own dance band, Dave Bartholomew and the Dew Droppers, named after a local hotel and nightclub, the Dew Drop Inn. The band became locally popular, described as "the bedrock of R&B in the city", and according to the music historian Robert Palmer, was a "model for early rock 'n' roll bands the world over". A local journalist wrote of the band, in June 1946: "Putting it mildly, they make the house 'rock'." In 1947, they were invited by club owner Don Robey to perform in Houston, Texas, where Bartholomew met Lew Chudd, the founder of Imperial Records.

Bartholomew and his band made their first recordings, including "She's Got Great Big Eyes", at Cosimo Matassa's New Orleans studio for De Luxe Records in September 1947. Their first hit was "Country Boy", credited to Dave Bartholomew and His Orchestra, which reached number 14 in the national Billboard R&B chart in early 1950. Prominent members of the band, besides Bartholomew on trumpet and occasional vocals, were saxophonists Alvin Tyler, Herb Hardesty, and Clarence Hall, bass player Frank Fields, guitarist Ernest McLean, pianist Salvador Doucette, and drummer Earl Palmer. They were later joined by saxophonist Lee Allen.

=== Imperial Records and Fats Domino ===
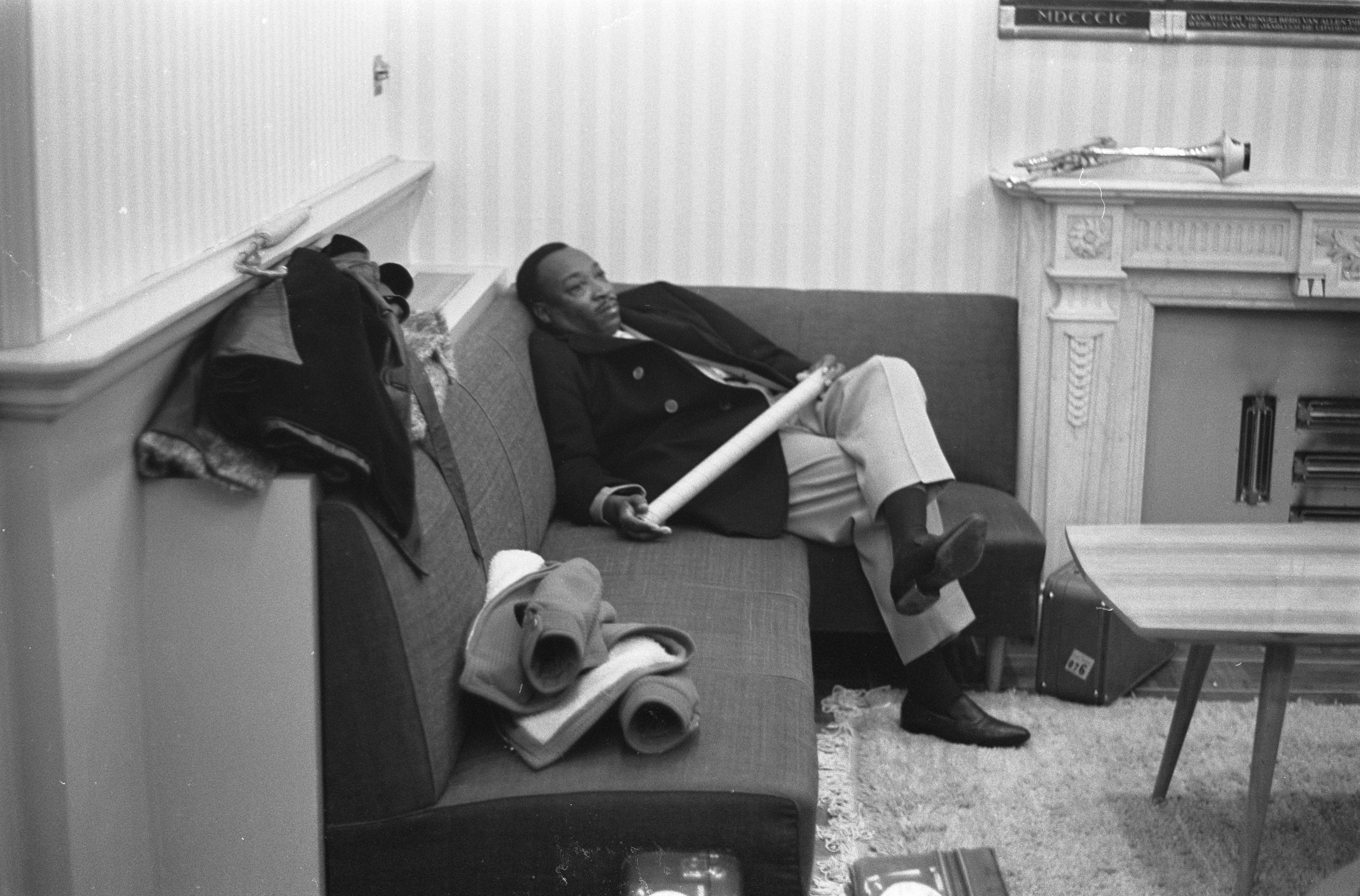
Bartholomew in Amsterdam, 1962.

Two years after they had first met in Houston, Lew Chudd asked Bartholomew to become Imperial's A&R man in New Orleans. Bartholomew produced Imperial's first national hits, "3 x 7 = 21", written by him and recorded by singer Jewel King, and "The Fat Man", recorded in December 1949 by a young pianist, Fats Domino. "The Fat Man" — based on the drug-themed "Junker's Blues", with lyrics rewritten by Bartholomew and Domino to attract a wider audience, reached number two on the R&B chart and eventually sold over one million copies, kicking off Domino's career.

Both records featured Bartholomew's band, as did a succession of further hits through the 1950s. Bartholomew's "genial, steady-rolling arrangements" contributed to the music's success. Cosimo Matassa said, "Many times, I think Fats' very salvation was Dave being able to be stern enough and rigid enough to insist on things getting done... He was adamant as he could be about the discipline of the players."

Bartholomew left Imperial after a disagreement with Chudd at the end of 1950, and for two years, he recorded for other labels, including Decca, King, and Specialty. Among his recordings at King was "My Ding-a-Ling", which Bartholomew wrote and first recorded in January 1952; the song was later recorded by Chuck Berry, who had an international hit with it in 1972, although Berry substantially changed the song's arrangement and verses and claimed credit for writing it. While at Specialty, Bartholomew produced Lloyd Price's recording of "Lawdy Miss Clawdy", which featured Domino (uncredited) on piano. The single reached number one on the R&B chart in mid-1952.

After that success, Bartholomew returned to Imperial to work again on Domino's recordings, co-writing and producing a series of R&B hits for him. Domino's crossover to the pop chart came in 1955 with "Ain't That a Shame" (initially titled "Ain't It a Shame"), on which Bartholomew deliberately sought to make Domino's style more appealing to white record buyers. Further hits followed through the late 1950s and early 1960s: "I'm in Love Again" and "Blue Monday" (both in 1956), "I'm Walkin'" (1957), "I'm Gonna Be a Wheel Someday" (1959), "Let the Four Winds Blow" (1961) — all co-written and produced by Bartholomew — and "Blueberry Hill" (1956) and "Walking to New Orleans" (1960), also produced by Bartholomew.

Over the same period, Bartholomew wrote, arranged, and produced recordings by many other Imperial artists, including Smiley Lewis (for whom Bartholomew wrote "I Hear You Knocking" and "One Night", both of which were hits and were later recorded by other musicians), the Spiders, Chris Kenner, Earl King, Tommy Ridgley, Robert Parker, T-Bone Walker, Roy Brown, Frankie Ford, and Shirley and Lee (who recorded for Aladdin Records and for whom Bartholomew produced "Let the Good Times Roll"). Several of Bartholomew's songs were later covered by other musicians. "Ain't That A Shame" was recorded successfully by Pat Boone; "I Hear You Knocking" was a hit for Gale Storm in the 1950s and Dave Edmunds in the 1970s; "One Night" and "Witchcraft" were hits for Elvis Presley; and "I'm Walkin'" was a hit for Ricky Nelson. On various of his songs, a co-writing credit was given to his wife, Pearl King (sometimes confused with the musician Earl King).

=== Later life and death ===
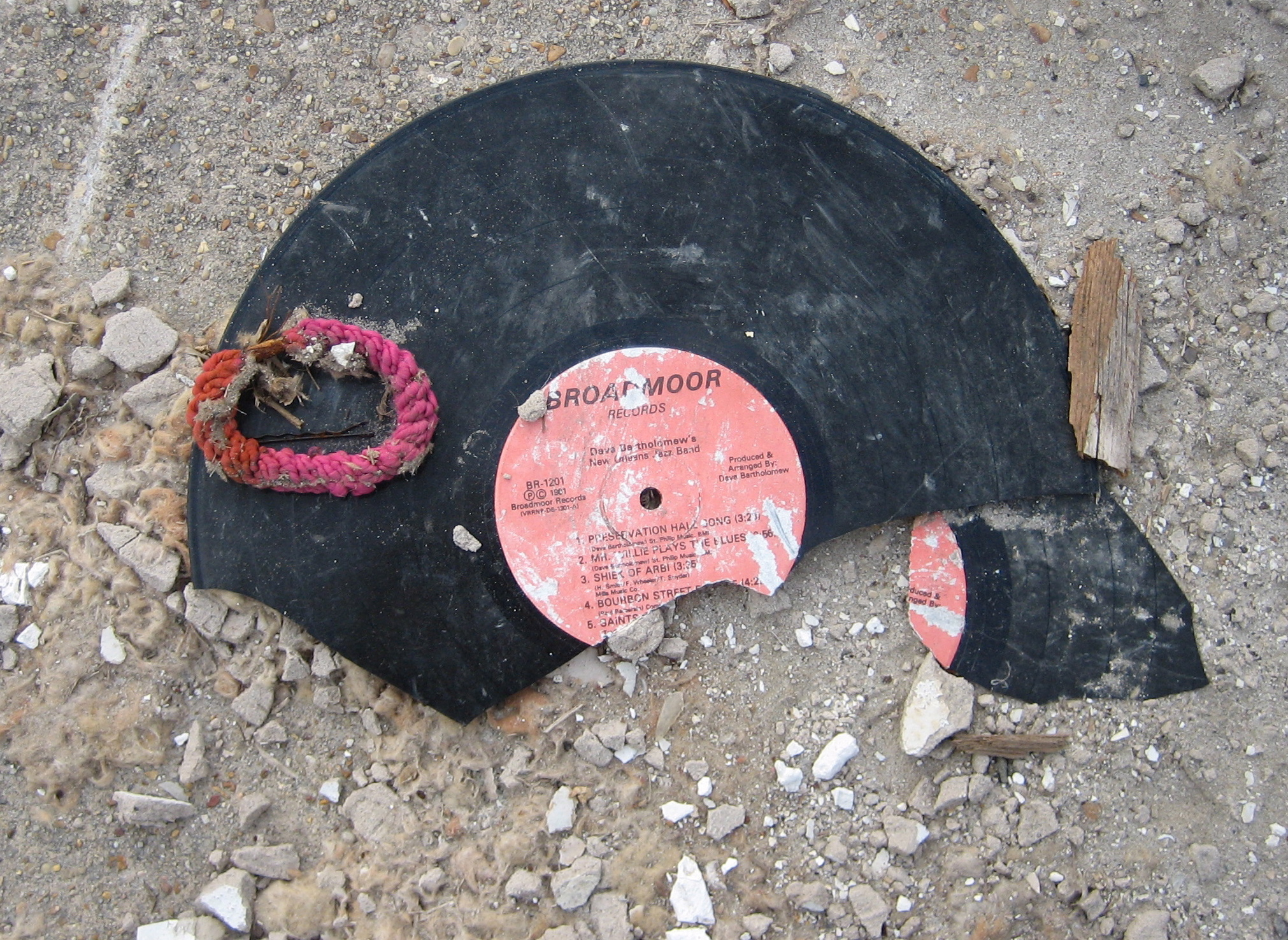
A broken Broadmoor record in debris in the formerly flooded Broadmoor neighborhood after Hurricane Katrina

After Imperial was sold to Liberty Records in Los Angeles in 1963, Bartholomew remained in New Orleans, working for Trumpet Records and Mercury Records and then establishing his own label, Broadmoor Records, in 1967. The label folded the following year, when its distributor, Dover Records, collapsed.

In the 1970s and 1980s, Bartholomew led a traditional Dixieland jazz band in New Orleans, releasing an album, Dave Bartholomew's New Orleans Jazz Band, in 1981. He also took part in Fats Domino's international tours during that period. He was inducted into the Rock and Roll Hall of Fame as a nonperformer in 1991, and released two further albums in that decade, Dave Bartholomew and the Maryland Jazz Band (1995) and New Orleans Big Beat (1998), while continuing to make occasional appearances with his band at festivals.

Bartholomew married Pearl King in 1942. After her death in 1967, he married Rhea (née Douse), with whom he had four sons and one daughter. He remained a resident of New Orleans, and celebrated his 100th birthday on Christmas Eve 2018, but plans for a celebration concert were suspended after he was hospitalized.

Bartholomew died of heart failure at East Jefferson General Hospital in Metairie, Louisiana on June 23, 2019. He was Catholic and was buried at St Gabriel the Archangel Catholic Church in Gentilly.

== Chart hits and other notable songs ==
Year	Song	Original artist	Co-writer(s) with Bartholomew	^{U.S. Pop}	^{U.S. R&B}	^{UK Singles Chart}	Other charting versions, and notes
1950	"3 x 7 = 21"	Jewel King		-	4	-	1955: The Spiders, #9 R&B (as "21")
1950	"Country Boy"	Dave Bartholomew and His Orchestra	Fats Domino	-	14	-	1960: Fats Domino, #25 US pop, #19 UK
1950	"The Fat Man"	Fats Domino	Fats Domino	-	2	-	
1951	"Tra-La-La"	Dave Bartholomew and His Orchestra	Tommy Ridgley	-	-	-	1951: The Griffin Brothers feat. Tommy Brown, #7 R&B
1952	"The Bells Are Ringing"	Smiley Lewis	Overton Lemons	-	10	-	
1952	"Poor Poor Me"	Fats Domino	Fats Domino	-	10	-	
1952	"My Ding-a-Ling"	Dave Bartholomew		-	-	-	1972: Chuck Berry, #1 US pop, #42 R&B, #1 UK
1953	"Going to the River"	Fats Domino	Fats Domino	-	2	-	1953: Chuck Willis, #4 R&B
1953	"Rose Mary"	Fats Domino	Fats Domino	-	10	-	
1953	"Something's Wrong"	Fats Domino	Fats Domino	-	6	-	
1954	"I'm Slippin' In"	The Spiders		-	6	-	
1954	"Blue Monday"	Smiley Lewis	Fats Domino	-	-	-	1956: Fats Domino, #5 US pop, #1 R&B, #23 UK; 1971: Dave Edmunds, #104 US pop 1989: Bob Seger, #40 rock
1955	"I Hear You Knocking"	Smiley Lewis	Pearl King	-	2	-	1955: Gale Storm, #2 US pop, #15 R&B; 1961: Fats Domino, #67 US pop 1970: Dave Edmunds, #4 US pop, #1 UK
1955	"Don't You Know"	Fats Domino	Fats Domino	-	7	-	
1955	"Let the Four Winds Blow"	Dave Bartholomew	Fats Domino	-	-	-	1957: Roy Brown, No. 29 US pop, No. 5 R&B; 1961: Fats Domino, No. 15 US pop, No. 2 R&B; 1962: Sandy Nelson, No. 107 pop 1967: Jerry Jaye, No. 107 US pop 1974: Jack Reno, No. 57 country
1955	"Witchcraft"	The Spiders	Pearl King	-	5	-	1963: Elvis Presley, No. 32 US pop
1955	"Ain't That a Shame"	Fats Domino	Fats Domino	10	1	23	1955: Pat Boone, No. 1 US pop, No. 14 R&B, No. 7 UK; 1963: The Four Seasons, No. 22 US pop, No. 38 UK; 1972: Hank Williams Jr., No. 7 country 1979: Cheap Trick, No. 35 US pop
1955	"All By Myself"	Fats Domino	Fats Domino	-	1	-	
1955	"I Can't Go On"	Fats Domino	Fats Domino	-	6	-	
1956	"One Night"	Smiley Lewis	Pearl King (later recordings also credit Anita Steinman)	-	11	-	1958: Elvis Presley, No. 4 US pop, No. 10 R&B, No. 1 UK; 1972: Jeannie C. Riley, No. 57 country 1975: Mud, No. 32 UK; 1976: Roy Head, No. 51 country 2005: Elvis Presley, No. 1 UK (reissue)
1956	"Please Listen to Me"	Smiley Lewis	Pearl King	-	9	-	
1956	"Try Rock and Roll"	Bobby Mitchell	Pearl King'	-	14	-	
1956	"Bo Weevil"	Fats Domino	Fats Domino	35	5	-	1956: Teresa Brewer, No. 17 US pop
1956	"Don't Blame It on Me"	Fats Domino	Fats Domino	-	9	-	
1956	"I'm In Love Again"	Fats Domino	Fats Domino	3	1	12	1956: The Fontane Sisters, No. 38 US pop 1963: Ricky Nelson, No. 67 US pop
1956	"So-Long"	Fats Domino	Fats Domino	44	5	-	
1956	"Honey Chile"	Fats Domino	Fats Domino	-	2	29	
1957	"I'm Walkin'"	Fats Domino	Fats Domino	4	1	19	1957: Ricky Nelson, No. 4 US pop, No. 10 R&B; 1969: Dave Peel, No. 66 country 1977: Doug Kershaw, No. 96 country
1957	"The Rooster Song"	Fats Domino	Fats Domino	-	13	-	
1957	"Valley of Tears"	Fats Domino	Fats Domino	8	2	25	1961: Buddy Holly, No. 12 UK
1957	"Keeper of My Heart"	Faye Adams	Pearl King	-	13	-	
1957	"I'm Gonna Be a Wheel Someday"	Bobby Mitchell	Fats Domino, Roy Hayes	-	-	-	1959: Fats Domino, No. 17 US pop, No. 22 R&B
1957	"When I See You"	Fats Domino	Fats Domino	29	14	-	
1957	"Wait and See"	Fats Domino	Fats Domino	23	7	-	
1957	"I Still Love You"	Fats Domino	Fats Domino	79	-	-	
1957	"The Big Beat"	Fats Domino	Fats Domino	26	15	20	
1957	"I Want You To Know"	Fats Domino	Fats Domino	32	-	-	
1958	"Yes, My Darling"	Fats Domino	Fats Domino	55	10	-	
1958	"No, No"	Fats Domino	Fats Domino	55	-	-	
1958	"Sick and Tired"	Fats Domino	Fats Domino	22	14	26	
1958	"Little Mary"	Fats Domino	Fats Domino	49	4	-	
1958	"Young School Girl"	Fats Domino	Fats Domino	92	15	-	
1958	"Whole Lotta Loving"	Fats Domino	Fats Domino	6	2	-	1973: Hank Williams Jr. & Lois Johnson, No. 22 country
1960	"If You Need Me"	Fats Domino	Fats Domino	98	-	-	
1960	"Tell Me That You Love Me"	Fats Domino	Fats Domino	51	-	-	
1960	"Before I Grow Too Old"	Fats Domino	Fats Domino	84	-	-	
1960	"Walking to New Orleans"	Fats Domino	Fats Domino, Bobby Charles	6	2	19	
1960	"My Girl Josephine"	Fats Domino	Fats Domino	14	7	32	1963: Wayne Fontana & the Mindbenders, No. 46 UK (as "Hello Josephine"); 1967: Jerry Jaye, No. 29 US pop 1984: J. W. Thompson, No. 91 country (as "Hello Josephine"); 1995: Super Cat, No. 22 UK
1960	"Natural Born Lover"	Fats Domino	Fats Domino	38	28	-	
1961	"Shu Rah"	Fats Domino	Fats Domino	32	-	-	
1961	"It Keeps Rainin'"	Fats Domino	Fats Domino, Bobby Charles	23	18	49	1993: Bitty McLean, No. 2 UK
1961	"What a Party"	Fats Domino	Fats Domino	22	-	43	
1962	"Ida Jane"	Fats Domino	Fats Domino	90	-	-	
1962	"Nothing New (Same Old Thing)"	Fats Domino	Fats Domino, Pee Wee Maddux, Jack Jessup	77	-	-	
1962	"Dance with Mr. Domino"	Fats Domino	Fats Domino	98	-	-	

== See also ==
- New Orleans rhythm and blues
