= Tipitina's Foundation =

United States non-profit

- Type: Donor Advised Fund under Music's Promise
- Genre: Musical
- Founded: 2026
- Founder: Galactic
- Headquarters: New Orleans, Louisiana, USA
- Area served: New Orleans, LA
- Revenue: 853,033 United States dollar (2016)
- Total assets: 365,085 United States dollar (2011)
- Parent: Tipitina's
- Website: http://tipitinasfoundation.com

Tipitina's Foundation is a not-for-profit charity organization that grew out of the New Orleans music venue, Tipitina's. Based in New Orleans, Louisiana, to promote the future of culture, music, and heritage via the Tipitina’s venue.

The name is taken from the classic New Orleans piano tune, "Tipitina", written by Professor Longhair, also the name of a popular nightspot in New Orleans.

== See also ==
- Tipitina's
