= Fats Domino =

American pianist and singer (1928–2017)

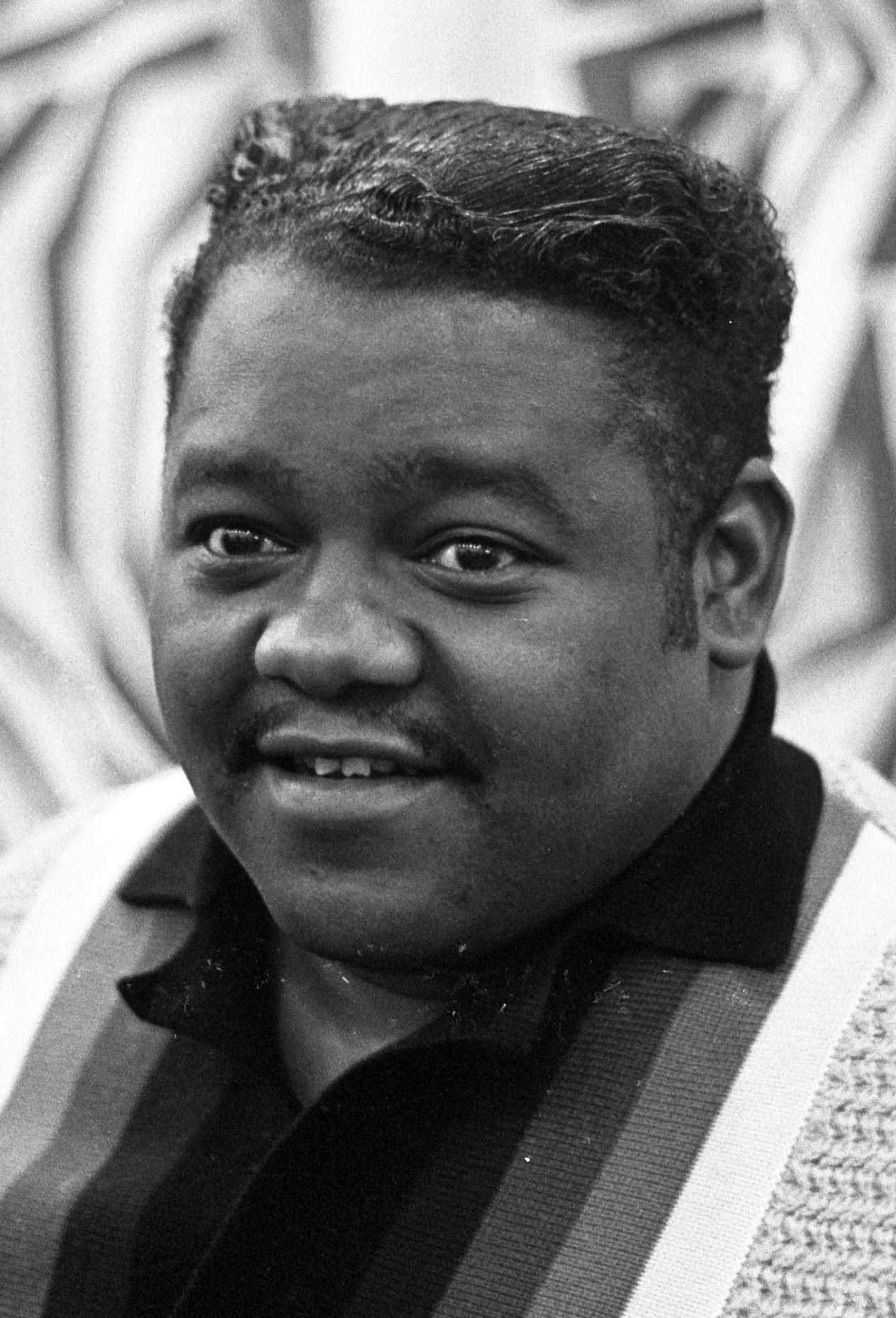
- Domino in 1962
- Born: Antoine Caliste Domino Jr. February 26, 1928; New Orleans, Louisiana, U.S.
- Died: October 24, 2017 (aged 89); Harvey, Louisiana, U.S.
- Other names: Fats; The Fat Man
- Occupations: Singer; songwriter; pianist
- Years active: 1942–2016
- Spouse: Rosemary Hall (m. 1947; died 2008)
- Children: 8
- Musical career
- Genres: Rock and roll; New Orleans R&B; boogie-woogie; blues
- Instruments: Vocals; piano
- Labels: Imperial; London; Renown; ABC; Mercury; Broadmoor; Reprise; Sonet; Warner Bros.; Toot Toot

Antoine Caliste "Fats" Domino Jr. (February 26, 1928 – October 24, 2017) was an American singer-songwriter and pianist. One of the pioneers of rock and roll music, Domino sold more than 65 million records. Born in New Orleans to a French Creole family, Domino signed to Imperial Records in 1949. His first single "The Fat Man" is cited by some historians as the first rock and roll single and the first to sell more than 1 million copies. Domino continued to work with the song's co-writer Dave Bartholomew, contributing his distinctive rolling piano style to Lloyd Price's "Lawdy Miss Clawdy" (1952) and scoring a string of mainstream hits beginning with "Ain't That a Shame" (1955). Between 1955 and 1960, he had eleven Top 10 US pop hits. By 1955, five of his records had sold more than a million copies, being certified gold.

Domino was shy and modest by nature but made a significant contribution to the rock and roll genre. Elvis Presley declared Domino a "huge influence on me when I started out" and when they first met in 1959, described him as "the real king of rock 'n' roll". The Beatles were also heavily influenced by Domino.

Four of Domino's records were named to the Grammy Hall of Fame for their significance: "Blueberry Hill", "Ain't That a Shame", "Walking to New Orleans" and "The Fat Man". He was inducted into the Rock and Roll Hall of Fame as part of its first group of inductees in 1986. The Associated Press estimates that during his career, Domino "sold more than 110 million records".

== Biography ==
=== Early life and education ===
Antoine Domino Jr. was born and raised in New Orleans, Louisiana, the youngest of eight children born to Antoine Caliste Domino (1879–1964) and Marie-Donatille Gros (1886–1971). The Domino family was of French Creole background, and Louisiana Creole was his first language. Like most such families, the Dominos were Catholic.

Antoine was born at home with the assistance of his grandmother, a midwife. His name was initially misspelled as Anthony on his birth certificate. His family had recently arrived in the Lower Ninth Ward from Vacherie, Louisiana. His father was a part-time violin player who worked at a racetrack.

He attended the Louis B. Macarty School, leaving to start work as a helper to an ice delivery man. Domino learned to play the piano in about 1938 from his brother-in-law, the jazz guitarist Harrison Verrett.

=== Early career (1940s) ===
By age 14, Domino was performing in New Orleans bars. In 1947, Billy Diamond, a New Orleans bandleader, accepted an invitation to hear the young pianist perform at a backyard barbecue. Domino played well enough that Diamond asked him to join his band, the Solid Senders, at the Hideaway Club in New Orleans, where he would earn $3 a week playing the piano. Diamond nicknamed him "Fats".

=== Recordings for Imperial Records (1949–1962) ===
Domino was signed to the Imperial Records label in 1949 by owner Lew Chudd, to be paid royalties based on sales instead of a fee for each song. He and producer Dave Bartholomew wrote "The Fat Man", a toned down version of a song about drug addicts called "Junker Blues"; the record had sold a million copies by 1951. Featuring a rolling piano and Domino vocalizing "wah-wah" over a strong backbeat, "The Fat Man" is widely considered the first rock-and-roll record to achieve this level of sales. In 2015, the song would enter the Grammy Hall of Fame.

Domino released a series of hit songs with Bartholomew (also the co-writer of many of the songs), the saxophonists Herbert Hardesty and Alvin "Red" Tyler, the bassist Billy Diamond and later Frank Fields, and the drummers Earl Palmer and Smokey Johnson. Other notable and long-standing musicians in Domino's band were the saxophonists Reggie Houston, Lee Allen, and Fred Kemp, Domino's trusted bandleader.

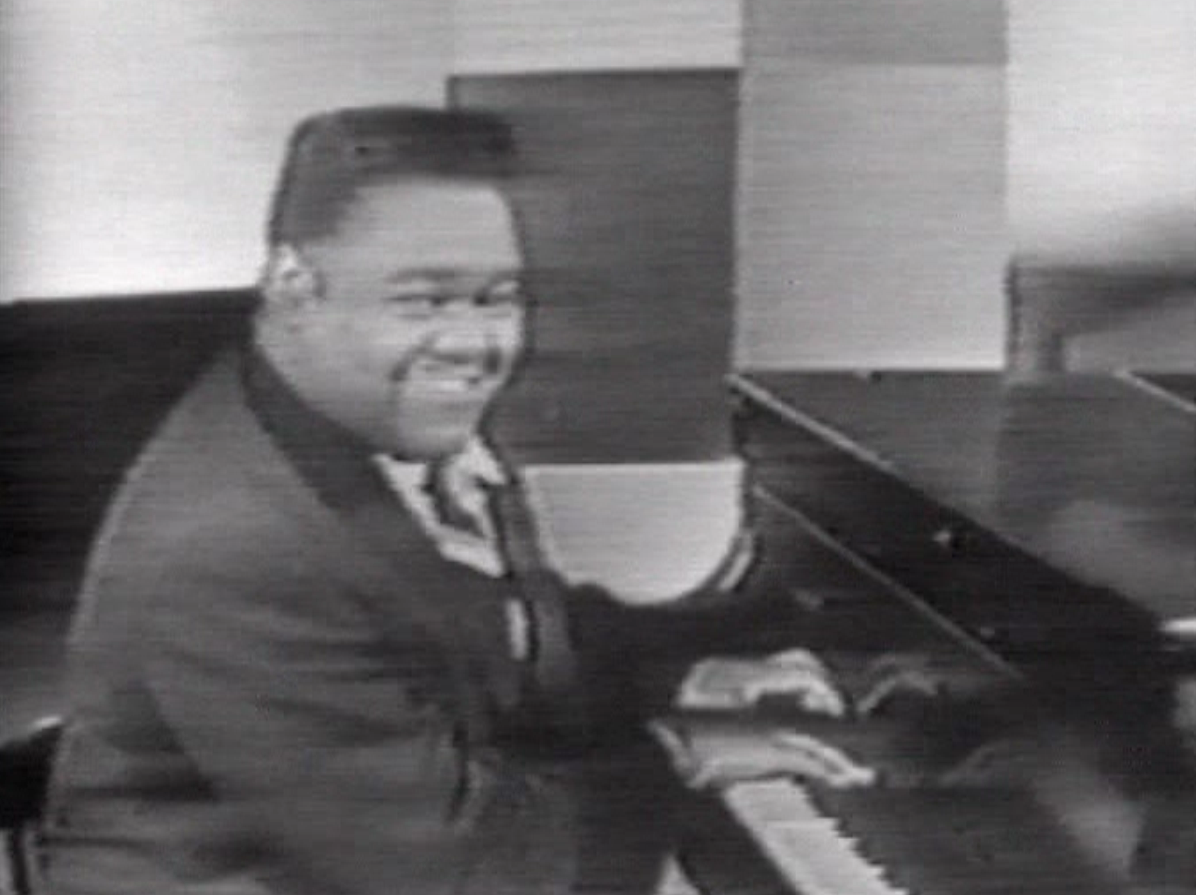
Domino singing "Blueberry Hill" on The Ed Sullivan Show in 1956

While Domino's own recordings were done for Imperial, he sometimes sat in during that time as a session musician on recordings by other artists for other record labels. Domino's rolling piano triplets provided the memorable instrumental introduction for Lloyd Price's first hit, "Lawdy Miss Clawdy", recorded for Specialty Records on March 13, 1952, at Cosimo Matassa's J&M Recording Studios in New Orleans (where Domino himself had earlier recorded "The Fat Man" and other songs). Dave Bartholomew was producing Price's record, which also featured familiar Domino collaborators Hardesty, Fields and Palmer as sidemen, and he asked Domino to play the piano part, replacing the original session pianist.

Domino crossed into the pop mainstream with "Ain't That a Shame" (mislabeled as "Ain't It a Shame") which reached the Top Ten. This was the first of his records to appear on the Billboard pop singles chart (on July 16, 1955), with the debut at number 14. A milder cover version by Pat Boone reached number 1, having received wider radio airplay in an era of racial segregation. In 1955, Domino was said to be earning $10,000 a week while touring, according to a report in Chuck Berry's memoir. Domino eventually had 37 Top 40 singles, but none made it to number 1 on the Pop chart.

Domino's debut album contained several of his recent hits and earlier blues tracks that had not been released as singles, and was issued on the Imperial label (catalogue number 9009) in November 1955, and was reissued as Rock and Rollin' with Fats Domino. The reissue reached number 17 on the Billboard Pop Albums chart.

His 1956 recording of "Blueberry Hill", a 1940 song by Vincent Rose, Al Lewis and Larry Stock (which had previously been recorded by Glenn Miller, Gene Autry, Louis Armstrong and others), reached number 2 on the Billboard Juke Box chart for two weeks and was number 1 on the R&B chart for 11 weeks. It was his biggest hit, selling more than 5 million copies worldwide in 1956 and 1957. The song was subsequently recorded by Elvis Presley, Little Richard, and Led Zeppelin. Some 32 years later, the song would enter the Grammy Hall of Fame.

Domino had further hit singles between 1956 and 1959, including "When My Dreamboat Comes Home" (Pop number 14), "I'm Walkin'" (Pop number 4), "Valley of Tears" (Pop number 8), "It's You I Love" (Pop number 6), "Whole Lotta Lovin'" (Pop number 6), "I Want to Walk You Home" (Pop number 8), and "Be My Guest" (Pop number 8). In 1957, Domino maintained "What they call rock 'n' roll now is rhythm and blues. I've been playing it for 15 years in New Orleans".

Domino appeared in two films released in 1956: Shake, Rattle & Rock! and The Girl Can't Help It. On December 18, 1957, his hit recording of "The Big Beat" was featured on Dick Clark's American Bandstand. He was also featured in a movie of the same name.

On November 2, 1956, a riot broke out at a Domino concert in Fayetteville, North Carolina. The police used tear gas to break up the unruly crowd. Domino jumped out a window to avoid the melee; he and two members of his band were slightly injured. During his career, four major riots occurred at his concerts, "partly because of integration", according to his biographer Rick Coleman. "But also the fact they had alcohol at these shows. So they were mixing alcohol, plus dancing, plus the races together for the first time in a lot of these places." In August 1957, he was banned from performing at Griffith Stadium in Washington, DC due to security concerns raised by city commissioner Robert McLaughlin.

In November 1957, Domino appeared on The Ed Sullivan Show; no disturbance accompanied this performance.

In the same year, the article "King of Rock 'n' Roll" in Ebony magazine featured Domino who said he was on the road 340 days a year, up to $2,500 per evening, and grossing over $500,000; Domino also told readers that he owned 50 suits, 100 pairs of shoes and a $1,500 diamond horseshoe stick pin.

Domino had a steady series of hits for Imperial through early 1962, including "Walking to New Orleans" (1960, Pop number 6), co-written by Bobby Charles, and "My Girl Josephine" (Pop number 14) in the same year. He toured Europe in 1962 and met the Beatles who would later cite Domino as an inspiration. After returning, he played the first of his many stands in Las Vegas.

Imperial Records was sold in early 1963, and Domino left the label. "I stuck with them until they sold out," he said in 1979. In all, he recorded over 60 singles for Imperial, placing 40 songs in the top 10 on the R&B chart and 11 in the top 10 on the Pop chart, twenty-seven of which were double-sided hits.

=== Recordings after leaving Imperial (1963–1970s) ===
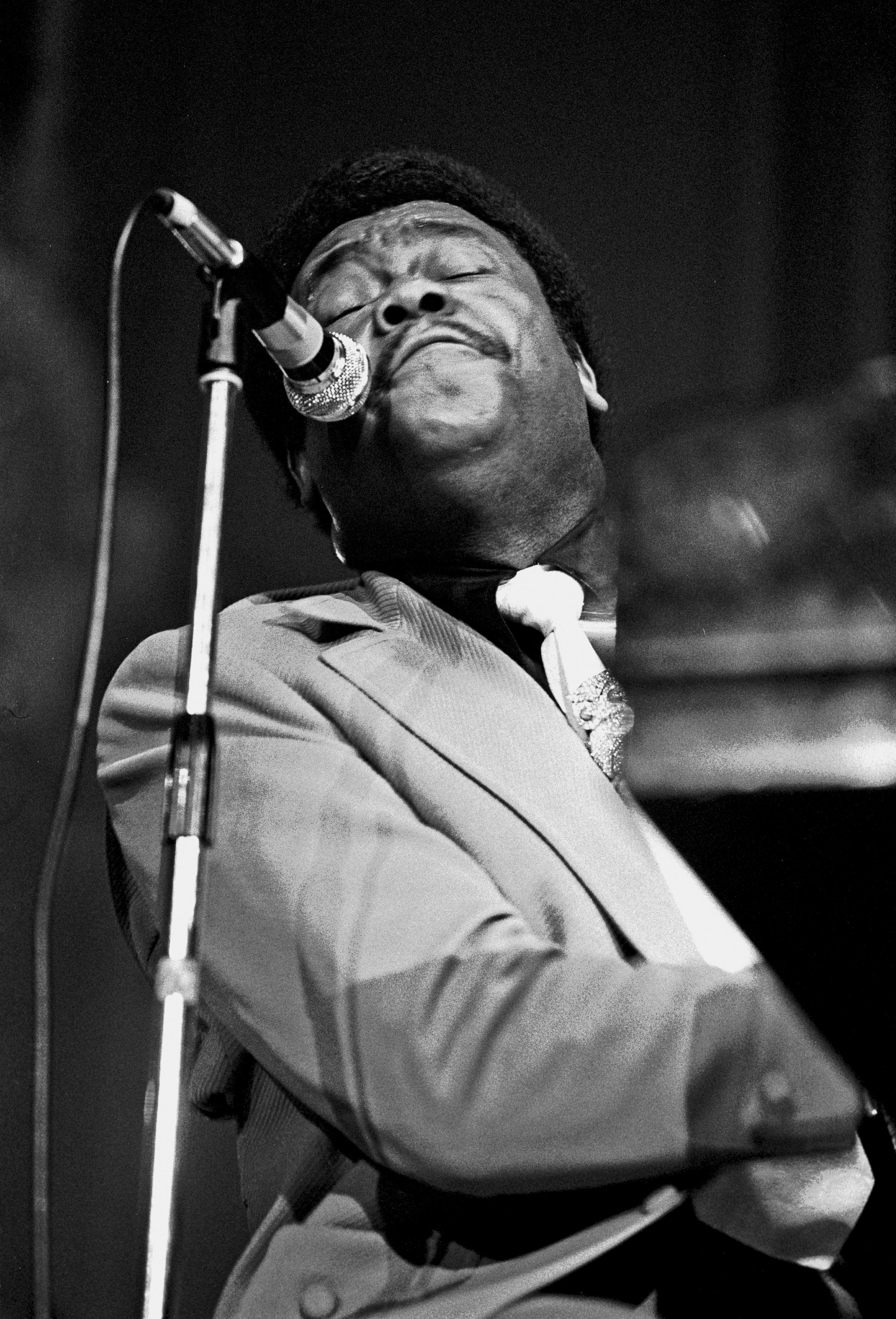
Domino in 1972

Domino moved to ABC-Paramount Records in 1963. The label dictated that he record in Nashville, Tennessee, rather than New Orleans. He was assigned a new producer (Felton Jarvis) and a new arranger (Bill Justis). Domino's long-term collaboration with the producer, arranger, and frequent co-writer Dave Bartholomew, who oversaw virtually all of his Imperial hits, was seemingly at an end. Jarvis and Justis changed the Domino sound somewhat, notably by adding the backing of a countrypolitan-style vocal chorus to most of his new recordings. He released 11 singles for ABC-Paramount, several which hit the Top 100 but just once entering the Top 40 ("Red Sails in the Sunset", 1963). By the end of 1964 the British Invasion had changed the tastes of the record-buying public, and Domino's chart run was over.

Despite the lack of chart success, Domino continued to record steadily until about 1970, leaving ABC-Paramount in mid-1965 and recording for Mercury Records, where he delivered a live album Fats Domino '65 and two singles. A studio album was planned but stalled with just four tracks recorded. Dave Bartholomew's small Broadmoor label (reuniting with Bartholomew along the way), featured many contemporary Soul infused sides and a few single releases but an album was not released overseas until 1971 to fulfill his Reprise Records contract. He shifted to that label after Broadmoor and had a Top 100 single, a cover of the Beatles' "Lady Madonna".

Domino appeared in the Monkees' television special 33⅓ Revolutions per Monkee filmed in December 1968 and aired in April 1969. In 1971, he opened for Ike & Tina Turner at Carnegie Hall. He continued to be popular as a performer for several decades. He made a cameo appearance in Clint Eastwood's movie Any Which Way You Can, filmed in 1979 and released in 1980, singing the country song "Whiskey Heaven", which later became a minor hit. His life and career were showcased in Joe Lauro's 2015 documentary The Big Beat: Fats Domino and the Birth of Rock 'n' Roll.

=== Later career (1980s–2005) ===
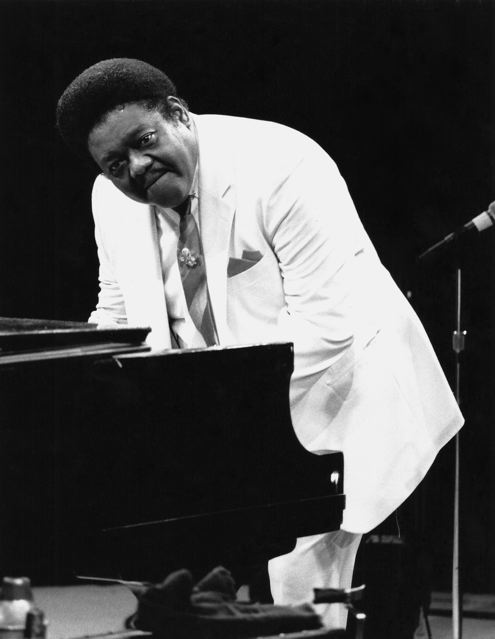
Domino performing in New York in the 1980s

In 1986, Domino was one of the first musicians to be inducted into the Rock and Roll Hall of Fame. He also received the Grammy Lifetime Achievement Award in 1987. Domino's last album for a major label, Christmas Is a Special Day, was released in 1993.

Domino lived in a mansion in a predominantly working-class neighborhood in the Lower Ninth Ward, where he was a familiar sight in his bright pink Cadillac automobile. He made yearly appearances at the New Orleans Jazz & Heritage Festival and other local events.

His last tour was in Europe, for three weeks in 1995. After being ill while on tour, Domino decided he would no longer leave the New Orleans area, having a comfortable income from royalty payments and a dislike of touring and claiming he could not get any food that he liked anywhere else. In the same year, he received the Rhythm & Blues Foundation's Ray Charles Lifetime Achievement Award.

In 1998, President Bill Clinton awarded him the National Medal of Arts. Domino declined an invitation to perform at the White House.

In 2004, Rolling Stone magazine ranked him number 25 on its list of the "100 Greatest Artists of All Time" in an essay written by Dr. John.

=== Domino and Hurricane Katrina ===
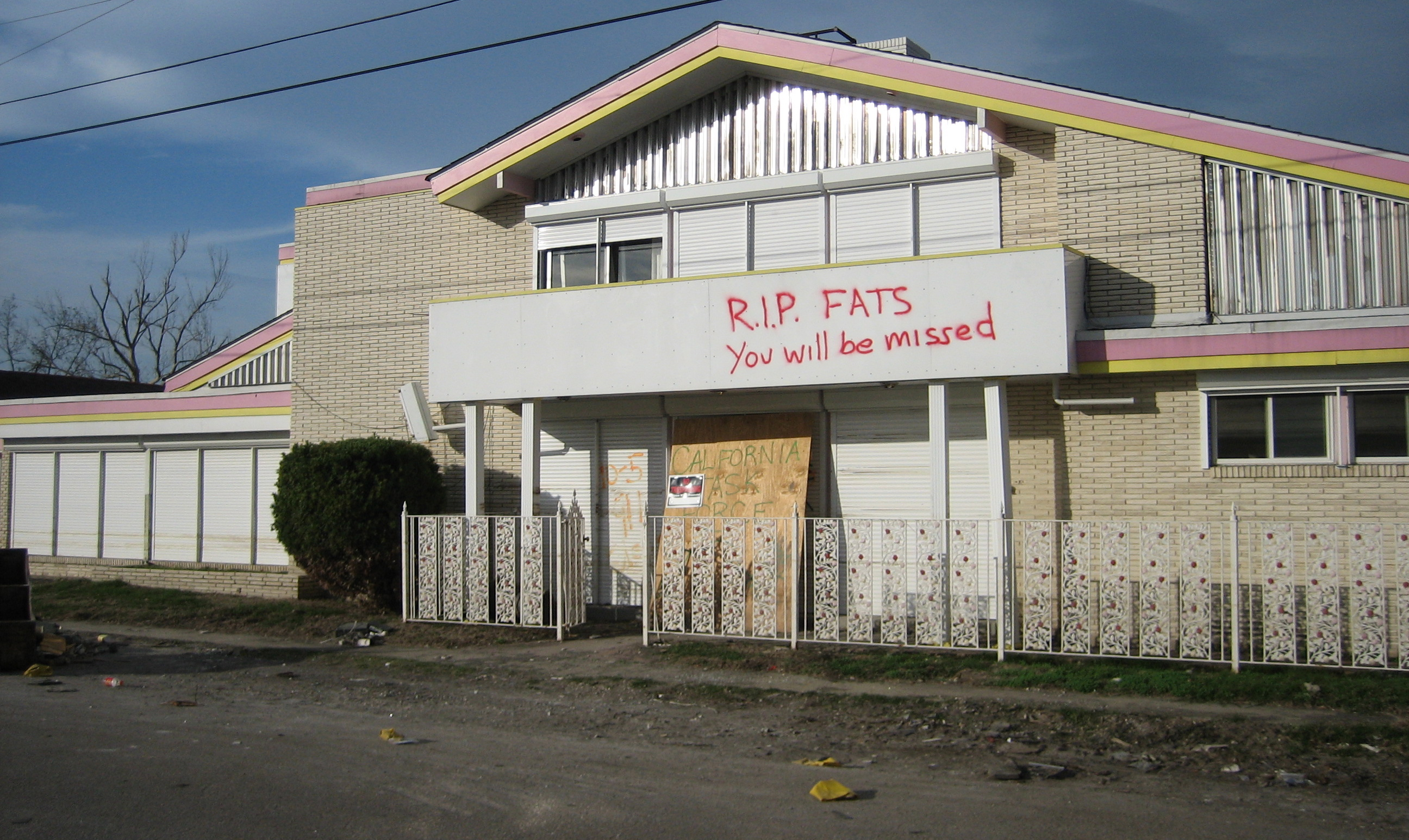
Graffiti on Domino's home from the time he was rumored dead in the aftermath of Hurricane Katrina (2005)

As Hurricane Katrina approached New Orleans in August 2005, Domino chose to stay at home with his family, partly because his wife, Rosemary, was in poor health. His house was in an area that was heavily flooded.

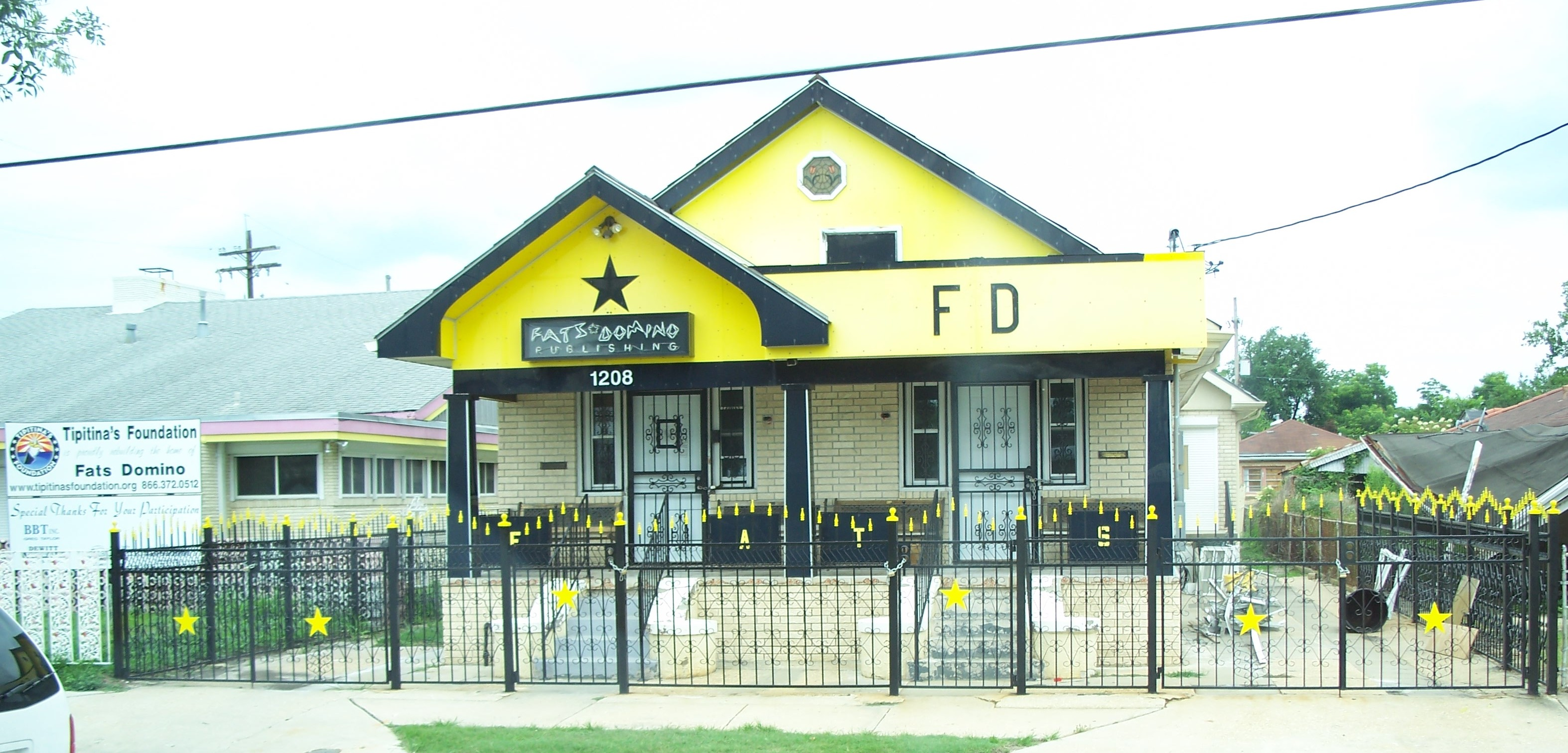
Domino's office, June 2007

Domino was rumored to have died in the hurricane, and his home was vandalized when someone spray-painted the message "RIP Fats. You will be missed". On September 1, the talent agent Al Embry announced that he had not heard from Domino since before the hurricane struck. Later that day, CNN reported that Domino had been rescued by a Coast Guard helicopter. Until then, even family members had not heard from him since before the storm. Embry confirmed that Domino and his family had been rescued. The family was then taken to a shelter in Baton Rouge, after which they were picked up by JaMarcus Russell, the starting quarterback of the Louisiana State University football team, and the boyfriend of Domino's granddaughter. He let the family stay in his apartment. The Washington Post reported that on September 2, they had left Russell's apartment after sleeping three nights on the couch. "We've lost everything," Domino said, according to the Post.

By January 2006, work to gut and repair Domino's home and office had begun. In the meantime, the Domino family resided in Harvey, Louisiana.

President George W. Bush made a personal visit and replaced the National Medal of Arts that President Bill Clinton had previously awarded Domino. The gold records were replaced by the RIAA and Capitol Records, which owned the Imperial Records catalogue.

=== Later life ===
Domino was scheduled to perform at the 2006 Jazz & Heritage Festival in New Orleans. However, he was suffering from anxiety and was forced to cancel the performance, but he did appear to offer the audience an on-stage greeting.

In 2006 Domino's album Alive and Kickin' was released to benefit the Tipitina's Foundation, which supports indigent local musicians and helps preserve the New Orleans sound. The album consists of unreleased recordings from the 1990s and received great critical acclaim.

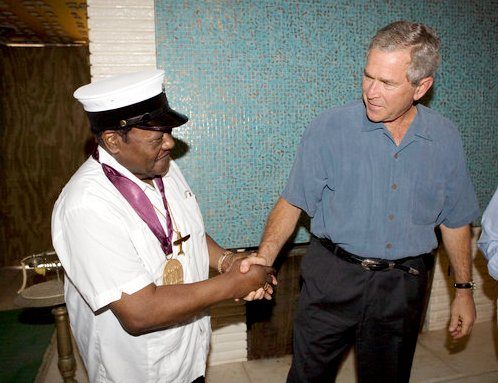
Domino with the National Medal of Arts replaced by President George W. Bush on August 29, 2006, after the original medal, awarded to him by President Bill Clinton, was lost in the floodwaters of Hurricane Katrina.

On January 12, 2007, Domino was honored with OffBeat magazine's Lifetime Achievement Award at the annual Best of the Beat Awards, held at the House of Blues in New Orleans. New Orleans Mayor Ray Nagin declared the day "Fats Domino Day in New Orleans" and presented him with a signed declaration. Domino returned to stage on May 19, 2007, at Tipitina's at New Orleans, performing to a full house. This was his last public performance. The concert was recorded for a 2008 TV presentation entitled Fats Domino: Walkin' Back to New Orleans. This was a fund-raising concert, featuring a number of artists. Domino donated his fee to the cause. Later that year, a Vanguard record was released, Goin' Home: A Tribute to Fats Domino featuring his songs as recorded by Elton John, Neil Young, Tom Petty, Robert Plant, Willie Nelson, Norah Jones, Lenny Kravitz, and Lucinda Williams. A portion of the proceeds was to be used by the Foundation to help restore Domino's publishing office which had been damaged by the hurricane.

In September 2007, Domino was inducted into the Louisiana Music Hall of Fame.

In May 2009, Domino made an unexpected appearance in the audience for the Domino Effect, a concert featuring Little Richard and other artists, aimed at raising funds to help rebuild schools and playgrounds damaged by Hurricane Katrina.

In October 2012, Domino was featured in season three of the television series Treme, playing himself. On August 21, 2016, Domino was inducted into the National Rhythm and Blues Hall of Fame. The ceremony was held in Detroit, Michigan. The other inductees were Dionne Warwick, Cathy Hughes, Smokey Robinson, Prince, and the Supremes. He had received the Rhythm & Blues Foundation's Ray Charles Lifetime Achievement Award in 1995. His song "The Fat Man" entered the Grammy Hall of Fame in 2015.

=== Death ===
Domino died on October 24, 2017, at his home in Harvey, Louisiana, at the age of 89, from natural causes, according to the coroner's office.

== Influence and legacy ==
Domino was one of the biggest stars of rock and roll in the 1950s, but he was not convinced that this was a new genre. In 1957, Domino said: "What they call rock 'n' roll now is rhythm and blues. I've been playing it for 15 years in New Orleans". According to Rolling Stone, "this is a valid statement ... all Fifties rockers, black and white, country born and city bred, were fundamentally influenced by R&B, the black popular music of the late Forties and early Fifties".

He was among the first R&B artists to gain popularity with white audiences. His biographer Rick Coleman argues that Domino's records and tours with rock and roll shows in that decade, bringing together Black and White youths in a shared appreciation of his music, was a factor in the breakdown of racial segregation in the United States. Domino himself did not define his work as rock and roll, saying, "It wasn't anything but the same rhythm and blues I'd been playin' down in New Orleans."

Both John Lennon and Paul McCartney recorded Domino songs. According to some reports, McCartney wrote the Beatles song "Lady Madonna" in emulation of Domino's style, combining it with a nod to Humphrey Lyttelton's 1956 hit "Bad Penny Blues". Domino recorded his own version of "Lady Madonna" in 1968, which became his final single to chart on the Billboard Hot 100. That recording, as well as covers of two other songs by the Beatles, appeared on his Reprise album Fats Is Back, produced by Richard Perry and with several hits recorded by a band that included the New Orleans pianist James Booker. McCartney later recorded "Ain't That a Shame", "I'm in Love Again" and "I'm Gonna Be a Wheel Someday" for his 1988 album CHOBA B CCCP.

Domino was present in the audience of 2,200 people at Elvis Presley's first concert at the Las Vegas Hilton on July 31, 1969. At a press conference after the show, when a journalist referred to Presley as "The King", Presley gestured toward Domino, who was taking in the scene. "No," Presley said, "that's the real king of rock and roll." Presley subsequently commented, "Rock 'n' roll was here a long time before I came along. Let's face it: I can't sing like Fats Domino can. I know that." He added that Domino was "a huge influence on me when I started out".

About a photograph taken of him and Presley together, Domino said, "Elvis told me he flopped the first time he came to Las Vegas. I loved his music. He could sing anything ... I'm glad we took this picture."

Domino received a Grammy Lifetime Achievement Award in 1987.

In 1994, the artists Paul Harrington and Charlie McGettigan won the Eurovision Song Contest for Ireland with the song "Rock 'n' Roll Kids". The songwriter, Brendan Graham, thought of the title whilst attending one of Domino's concerts at the Dublin National Stadium in 1991, and thanked Domino whilst reminiscing about receiving his Eurovision trophy, at the Sugar Club, Dublin, in 2014.

John Lennon covered Domino's composition "Ain't That a Shame" on his 1975 album Rock 'n' Roll, his tribute to the musicians who had influenced him.

American band Cheap Trick recorded "Ain't That a Shame" on their 1978 live album Cheap Trick at Budokan and released it as the second single from the album. It reached 35 of the Billboard Hot 100. Reportedly, this was Domino's favorite cover. It remains a staple of their live performances, including at their 25th Anniversary concert (which was recorded as the album and DVD Silver) and at their induction into the Rock and Roll Hall of Fame in 2016.

The music of Fats Domino became popular in Jamaica, where New Orleans radio stations could sometimes be heard, and has been cited as a seminal influence on what would later emerge as ska and reggae. The Jamaican reggae artist Yellowman covered many songs by Domino, including "Be My Guest" and "Blueberry Hill."

Jah Wobble, a post-punk bassist best known for his work with John Lydon, released a solo recording of "Blueberry Hill".

The Jamaican ska band Justin Hinds and the Dominoes, formed in the 1960s, was named after Domino, Hinds's favorite singer.

In 2007, various artists came together for a tribute to Domino, recording a live session containing only his songs. Musicians performing on the album, Goin' Home: A Tribute to Fats Domino, included Paul McCartney, Norah Jones, Willie Nelson, Neil Young, and Elton John.

According to Richie Unterberger, writing for AllMusic, Domino was one of the most consistent artists of early rock music, the best-selling African-American rock-and-roll star of the 1950s, and the most popular singer of the "classic" New Orleans rhythm and blues style. His million-selling debut single, "The Fat Man" (1949), is one of many that have been cited as the first rock and roll record. Robert Christgau wrote that Domino was "the most widely liked rock and roller of the '50s" and remarked on his influence:

Warm and unthreatening even by the intensely congenial standards of New Orleans, he's remembered with fond condescension as significantly less innovative than his uncommercial compatriots Professor Longhair and James Booker. But though his bouncy boogie-woogie piano and easy Creole gait were generically Ninth Ward, they defined a pop-friendly second-line beat that nobody knew was there before he and Dave Bartholomew created 'The Fat Man' in 1949. In short, this shy, deferential, uncharismatic man invented New Orleans rock and roll.

Domino's rhythm, accentuating the offbeat, as in the song "Be My Guest", was an influence on ska music.

== Personal life ==
Domino was married to Rosemary Domino (née Hall) from 1947 until her death in 2008; the couple had eight children: Antoine III (1950–2015), Anatole (1954–2023), Andre (1952–1997), Antonio, Antoinette, Andrea, Anola, and Adonica.

Even after his success he continued to live in his old neighborhood, the Lower Ninth Ward, until after Hurricane Katrina, when he moved to a suburb of New Orleans.

== Discography ==
- Rock and Rollin' with Fats Domino (1956)
- Fats Domino Rock and Rollin' (1956)
- This Is Fats Domino! (1956)
- Here Stands Fats Domino (1957)
- This Is Fats (1957)
- The Fabulous Mr. D (1958)
- Alive and Kickin' (2006)
