= Cosimo Matassa =

American recording engineer and studio owner (1926–2014)

- Matassa in front of J&M Studio building
- Born: Cosimo Vincent Matassa; April 13, 1926; New Orleans, Louisiana, U.S.
- Died: September 11, 2014 (aged 88); New Orleans, Louisiana, U.S.
- Occupations: Recording engineer, music studio owner
- Known for: J&M Recording Studio
- Awards: Rock and Roll Hall of Fame, Blues Hall of Fame, Grammy Trustees Award

Cosimo Vincent Matassa (April 13, 1926 – September 11, 2014) was an American recording engineer and studio owner, responsible for many R&B and early rock and roll recordings.

== Life and career ==
Matassa was born in New Orleans in 1926. In 1944 he began studies as a chemistry major at Tulane University, which he abandoned after completing five semesters of course work. In 1945, at the age of 18, Matassa opened the J&M Recording Studio at the back of his family's shop on Rampart Street, on the border of the French Quarter in New Orleans. In 1955, he moved to the larger Cosimo Recording Studio on Gov. Nichols Street, nearby in the French Quarter.

Nola Records, New Orleans-based record label, was having constant distribution problems. In 1965, he founded his national distribution company, Dover Records. His goal was to act as the distributor of numerous local and regional record labels in order to provide a way for the music of New Orleans and the Gulf Coast to be heard by a wider audience. In an effort to create a "one-stop shop," by 1967, Matassa relocated Cosimo Recording Studios from Gov. Nichols Street to what is now known as Jazz City Studio on Camp Street, now occupied by the New Orleans Zen Temple. This building also served as the head office of Superior Plastics, Matassa's vinyl record-pressing plant. His production company became the home of producers like Wardell Quezergue and Eddie Bo. One label, Axe Records, founded by Al Reed, made record "99 44/100 Pure Love" with regional success. Per Reed, Dover distributed an upwards of 25 labels, including his own and Art, Debt, Eight Ball, White Cliffs, and others.

As an engineer and proprietor, Matassa was crucial to the development of the sound of R&B, rock and soul of the 1950s and 1960s, often working with the producers Dave Bartholomew and Allen Toussaint. He recorded many hits, including Fats Domino’s "The Fat Man" (a contender for the first rock and roll record), Little Richard's "Tutti Frutti", and records by Ray Charles, Lee Dorsey, Dr. John, Smiley Lewis, Bobby Mitchell, Tommy Ridgley, the Spiders and many others. He was responsible for developing what became known as the New Orleans sound, with strong drums, heavy guitar and bass, heavy piano, light horns and a strong vocal lead. In the late 1950s and early 1960s, Matassa also managed the successful white New Orleans rock-and-roll performer Jimmy Clanton.

Matassa is interviewed on screen in the 2005 documentary film Make It Funky!, which presents a history of New Orleans music and its influence on rhythm and blues, rock and roll, funk and jazz.

Matassa retired from the music business in the 1980s to manage the family's food store, Matassa's Market, in the French Quarter. He died on September 11, 2014, aged 88, in New Orleans.

== Awards and honors ==
In December 1999, J&M Recording Studio was designated as a historic landmark.

In October 2007, Matassa was honored for his contributions to Louisiana music with induction into the Louisiana Music Hall of Fame. In the same year he was also given a Grammy Trustees Award.

On September 24, 2010, the Rock and Roll Hall of Fame and Museum designated J&M Recording Studio a historic Rock and Roll Landmark, one of 11 nationwide.

In 2012, he was inducted into the Rock and Roll Hall of Fame in Cleveland as a nonperformer. He was inducted to the Blues Hall of Fame in 2013.

== See also ==
- Italians in New Orleans
