= Miss Subways =

New York City advertising campaign (1941–1976)

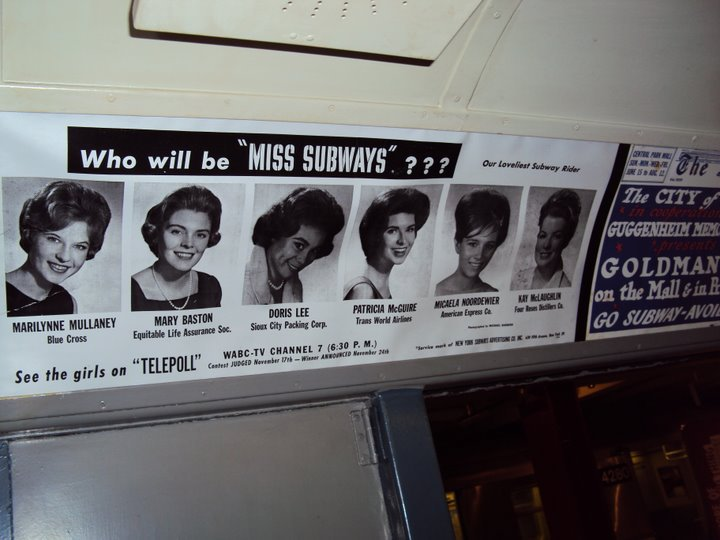
An advertisement for Miss Subways at the New York Transit Museum.

"Miss Subways" was a title accorded to individual New York City women between 1941 and 1976 (revived in 2017). In the early years, the woman named Miss Subways appeared on posters in New York City Subway trains, along with a brief description of her. In 1957, with 14,000 placards within trains, it was estimated that 5.9 million people viewed Miss Subways, daily. Around 200 women held the title during the 1941–76 program run by the New York Subways Advertising Company.

== Selection ==
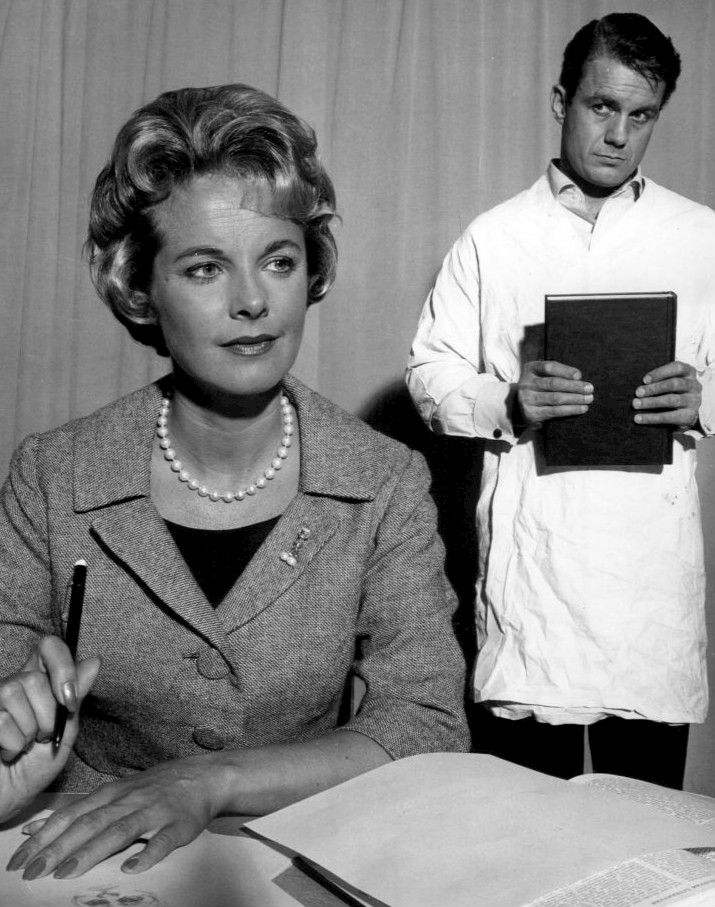
Mona Freeman Miss Subways of May 1941 on TV with Cliff Robertson 20 years later

The method of selecting Miss Subways varied over time, typically taking the form of a beauty contest with the general rule that, to be eligible, a woman had to be a New York City resident who used the subway, herself. "John Robert Powers, the head of the modeling agency, selected the winners" until 1961 or 1962 and later "for some years, winners were chosen by the contest organizers."

Before 1952, there were monthly selections of Miss Subways. From 1952 to 1957, candidates were picked every two months although "Mr. Powers once picked seven winners to reign side by side in the subway." By 1957, they were all hand-picked based on how much they exuded a "girl next door" quality:

All Miss Subways have one thing in common. They look – or are supposed to look – like the girl next door. About 400 wholesome young things enter each of the three yearly contests. The winners are picked by John Robert Powers model agency millionaire. Mr. Powers says he wants "no glamour gal types or hand-painted masterpieces." Professional models, actresses and entertainers are taboo. Anyone else over 17 may enter. The Miss Subways have been secretaries, service women, nurses, sales girls, and receptionists.

John Robert Powers was no longer involved in selection by 1963 when the contest changed to "public vote ... by post card." The first winner of the public vote was Ann Napolitano who was an executive secretary at the advertising agency Doyle, Dane & Bernbach. The New York Subways Advertising Company "redirected the contest to reflect the girl who works – what New York City is all about." Winners were given bracelets with gold-plated (later, silver-plated) subway tokens." Spaulding commented in 1971 that "Prettiness per se is passé. It's personality and interest pursuits that count" and described how "each contest attracts between 300 and 400 entries, submitted by family, friends and colleagues. About 30 are selected for a personal interview 'to judge personality and make certain that the submitted picture is a good likeness.' Most of the winners have been stenographers, clerks, receptionists and some have been teachers and stewardesses."

Subsequent to the postcard system, winners were usually chosen by telephone-based voting, from among a group of nominees whose photos were placed on the subways. Title holders were photographed by the likes of James J. Kriegsmann who "specialized in pictures of stage and screen stars, but he also photographed ordinary people, including the women who appeared in the Miss Subways promotion for more than 30 years."

In 2004, the Metropolitan Transportation Authority, in conjunction with the New York Post, brought back the program, now named "Ms. Subways," for one year only. A voting contest was held to determine the winner, Caroline Sanchez-Bernat, an actress. Posters of "Ms. Subways" appeared with subway safety tips instead of biographical notes.

== Significance ==
Miss Subways began as a way for the John Robert Powers Agency "to promote his models and for the New York Subways Advertising Company 'to increase eye traffic' for the adjoining...advertisements." "The contest provided the main plot device of Leonard Bernstein's 1944 musical On The Town, in which a smitten sailor on leave searched for 'Miss Turnstiles.'"

By 1945, the four-year anniversary of the contest was commemorated nationally in Life Magazine. "Unlike Miss America, these queens represented the full spectrum of their constituency, mainly Irish, Italian, Latina and Jewish. Thelma Potter, who was studying at Brooklyn College at the time, was the first black Miss Subways 1947 (36 years before a black Miss America); the first Asian Miss Subways reigned in 1949." Potter stated, "It was progressive.... It stirred things up a bit."

The New York Subway Advertising Company was owned by Walter O'Malley, who moved the Brooklyn Dodgers to Los Angeles in 1958. Bernard Spaulding, the sales director for the New York Subways Advertising Company, said in 1971 that Miss Subways "was a World War II pinup phenomenon and then lost social significance." Miss Subways, however, was of "mythic significance to many," with Mayor Ed Koch saying in 1979:

Even now, I can sit in the subway, and look up at the ads, and close my eyes, and there's Miss Subways", he said. "She wasn't the most beautiful girl in the world but she was ours. She was our own Miss America."

In 1983, when there were public calls for the contest to continue, a Metropolitan Transportation Authority representative stated that it would be "irrelevant and socially unacceptable," and thus not viable, to restart Miss Subways. In 2004, journalist Melanie Bush commented:

[The] posters were also covertly feminist, sometimes shockingly so, even to [Bush], a child of the 70s. From the first ('Mona Freeman, wants to be a top notch freelance illustrator') to the last ('Heidi Hafner ... Her goal: a flight instructor's rating'), they focused on women's ambitions, and in the 1940s or the 70s or [2000s], that's a rare rose to find clamped in the teeth of mass advertising. Yet there it was, and there it more or less firmly remained, probably because the contest was structured during World War II, when more than three million women were offered paying work for the first time, and were thus riding the subways, not to mention operating them, in much greater numbers than before.

The posters were at their most radical during the war years, and equally reflect women's later return to the home. Miss Subways' journey tracks a clear underground parallel to the prescribed roles of her sisters' above: While the civilian women of World War II may have been crucial to the work force, the purpose of housewives, as Betty Friedan puts it, 'is to buy more things for the house.'

From the exhilarating peak of December 1942's Marguerite McAuliffe, 'whose aim is to be a doctor as good as her dad,' and November 1943's Cecile Woodley, whose 'main interests are her job and the Navy ... enthusiastically O.K.'s skiing, Mozart and Katharine Hepburn,' we slide submissively toward Irene Scheidt, June 1950, whose 'fondest hope is a trip to Bermuda.' Then up we go again to Eleanor Nash, November 1960, 'young, beautiful, and expert with a rifle.' ... What I waited for each new month was: What did she do? What were her goals? The Miss Subways I wanted to be was the airplane pilot. Or how about 'travel writer'? 'Scientist'? 'Surgeon'? ... Maybe next month she'd plan to be an astronaut. Or president!

What was actually going on here, I saw, was women, real New York women, talking to each other about their intentions and transmitting these messages through the medium of some men's advertising campaign.

Ellen Hart Sturm, owner of the New York diner Ellen's Stardust Diner, was Miss Subways in 1959; her diner features photos of many past Miss Subways on the walls.

== Revival of "Miss Subways" ==
In 2017, the "Miss Subways Pageant" was resurrected and produced by The City Reliquary in the backyard of the museum. To update the event for the twenty-first century, the competition was open to all genders, body types, and ages. A panel of local celebrity judges including NY1 reporter Roger Clark awarded the title, sash, and crown to performance artist Lisa Levy. Levy campaigned on a platform of being the first postmenopausal Miss Subways. Miss Congeniality, an addition to the original pageant, was taken by Suzie Sims-Fletcher, a communications consultant. In 2018, The Riders Alliance joined the City Reliquary as a co-organizer of the event. The 2018 winner was Parker MacLure, a government employee who competed in drag. The event was hosted at Littlefield in Gowanus. Miss Subways returned to Littlefield for the 2019 event and the winner was Dylan Greenberg, a trans queer musician and director who fronts the band Theophobia.

The event went on hiatus with the onset of the COVID-19 pandemic and was not presented in 2020, 2021, or 2022. In 2023, the City Reliquary revived the event at the Sideshows by the Seashore Theater of Coney Island USA, no longer in partnership with Riders Alliance. The event was emceed by Maggie McMuffin, 2023 Miss Coney Island. The winner of the 2023 Miss Subways crown was Harmony "Hardcore" Vehling, a marketing manager. 2023 celebrity judges included Greg Young from The Bowery Boys podcast, New York Nico, Miss Subways 2017 Lisa Levy, New York City artist Reverend Jen Miller, and Maxine the Fluffy Corgi.

== List of titleholders ==
=== Original run ===
Year	Term	Name
1941	1 April – 30 April	Helen Bennett
1941	1 May – 31 May	Mona Freeman
1941	1 June – 30 June	Barbara Davis
1941	1 July – 31 July	Dorothy Herman
1941	1 August – 31 August	Jamie Sue Helms
1941	1 September – 30 September	
1941	1 October – 31 October	Helen Borgia
1941	1 November – 30 November	Muriel Schott
1941	1 December – 31 December	Ruth Ericsson
1942	–	Rita Ryan
1942	1 January – 31 January	–
1942	1 February – 28 February	Lucrezia Borgia
1942	1 March – 31 March	Elaine Kusins
1942	1 April – 30 April	Stasia Mikrut
1942	1 May – 31 May	–
1942	1 June – 30 June	Dorothea Mate-Michael
1942	1 July – 31 July	–
1942	1 August – 31 August	Rosemary Gregory
1942	1 September – 30 September	Evelyn Clark
1942	1 October – 31 October	–
1942	1 November – 30 November	Cecile Woodley
1942	1 December – 31 December	Marguerite McAuliffe
1943	1 January – 31 January	Edna Thompson
1943	1 February – 28 February	Connie Sameth
1943	1 March – 31 March	Edith Fagan
1943	1 April – 30 April	Rose-Ellen Cameron
1943	1 May – 31 May	Vita Monterosso
1943	1 June – 30 June	Evelyn Friedman
1943	1 July – 31 July	–
1943	1 August – 31 August	Tera Kathryn Davis
1943	1 September – 30 September	–
1943	1 October – 31 October	–
1943	1 November – 30 November	–
1943	1 December – 31 December	–
1944	–	Helen Mazley Kenny
1944	1 January – 31 January	Anne McConnell
1944	1 February – 29 February	Joan Cashman
1944	1 March – 31 March	Eileen Henry
1944	1 April – 30 April	Joan Vohs
1944	1 May – 31 May	Dawna Clawson
1944	1 May – 31 May	Doris Clawson
1944	1 May – 31 May	Dorothy Clawson
1944	1 June – 30 June	Winifred McAleer
1944	1 July – 31 July	Peggy Healy
1944	1 August – 31 August	Mary Radchuck
1944	1 September – 30 September	Doris Day
1944	1 October – 31 October	–
1944	1 November – 30 November	–
1944	1 December – 31 December	–
1945	1 January – 31 January	Ruth Lippman
1945	1 February – 28 February	Jean Grogan
1945	1 March – 31 March	–
1945	1 April – 30 April	Rita Cuddy
1945	1 May – 31 May	–
1945	1 June – 30 June	–
1945	1 July – 31 July	Florence Luriea
1945	1 August – 31 August	Marian Hartman
1945	1 September – 30 September	–
1945	1 October – 31 October	–
1945	1 November – 30 November	Donna Hansen
1945	1 December – 31 December	Peggy Molloy
1946	1 January – 31 January	Jeanne Clark
1946	1 February – 28 February	Bette Taggart
1946	1 March – 31 March	Marie Theresa Thomas
1946	1 April – 30 April	Joanne van Cott
1946	1 May – 31 May	Dania Cross
1946	1 June – 30 June	Lanie Harper
1946	1 July – 31 July	Enid Berkowitz
1946	1 August – 31 August	Aline Newland
1946	1 September – 30 September	Patricia Burke
1946	1 October – 31 October	Mary Villacorta
1946	1 November – 30 November	Kay Landing
1946	1 December – 31 December	Shirley Levine
1947	1 January – 31 January	Iris Victor
1947	1 February – 28 February	Yola Monte
1947	1 March – 31 March	Frances Smith
1947	1 April – 30 April	Evelyn Burnley
1947	1 May – 31 May	–
1947	1 June – 30 June	–
1947	1 July – 31 July	Jeanne Gibson
1947	1 August – 31 August	Joan Attinson
1947	1 September – 30 September	June Wallace Thomson
1947	1 October – 31 October	Merry Condon
1947	1 November – 30 November	–
1947	1 December – 31 December	Gene Farley
1948	1 January – 31 January	Lynne Lyons
1948	1 February – 29 February	Marie McNally
1948	1 March – 31 March	–
1948	1 April – 30 April	Thelma Porter
1948	1 May – 31 May	Joan M. Lyman
1948	1 June – 30 June	Alice Smith Carlson
1948	1 July – 31 July	Frances Gallic
1948	1 August – 31 August	Dolores A. Beaver
1948	1 September – 30 September	Rosemary Wilson
1948	1 October 31 October	Marilyn Bell
1948	1 November – 30 November	Janet Barker
1948	1 December – 31 December	Mildred Florio
1949	1 January – 31 January	Janet Shanley
1949	1 February – 28 February	–
1949	1 March – 31 March	Dorothy Nolan
1949	1 April – 30 April	–
1949	1 May – 31 May	–
1949	1 June – 30 June	–
1949	1 July – 31 July	Eleanor Sterling
1949	1 August – 31 August	–
1949	1 September – 30 September	Elaine Levine
1949	1 October – 31 October	Harriet Young
1949	1 November – 30 November	Helen Lee
1949	1 December – 31 December	–
1950	1 January – 31 January	Mimi Ross
1950	1 February – 28 February	Saralee Singer
1950	1 March – 31 March	Angela Vorsteg
1950	1 April – 30 April	Margie Marra
1950	1 May – 31 May	Patti Freeman
1950	1 June – 30 June	Irene Scheidt
1950	1 July – 31 July	Anne Peregrim
1950	1 August – 31 August	Janet Ferguson
1950	1 September – 30 September	–
1950	1 October – 31 October	Pat De Lieto
1950	1 November – 30 November	–
1950	1 December – 31 December	–
1951	1 January – 31 January	Frances Carton
1951	1 February – 28 February	Marjorie Miller
1951	1 May – 30 June	Paula Ruszkai
1951	1 July – 31 August	Perside Stefanini
1951	1 September – 31 October	Jean Hagen
1951	1 November – 31 December	Connie Kermath
1952	1 January – 29 February	Jane Campus
1952	1 March – 30 April	Peggy Byrne
1952	1 May – 30 June	Anne Landolt
1952	1 July – 31 August	–
1952	1 September – 31 October	Vanita Brown
1952	1 November – 31 December	Luule Kula
1953	1 January – 28 February	–
1953	1 March – 30 April	Janet Magni Kulisan
1953	1 May – 30 June	Mary Gardiner
1953	1 July – 31 August	Marie Graham
1953	1 September – 31 October	Gwenn Clifford
1953	1 November – 31 December	Kathleen McLean
1954	1 January – 28 February	Mary Alice Gray
1954	1 March – 30 April	–
1954	1 May – 30 June	Juliette Rose Lee
1954	1 July – 31 August	–
1954	1 September – 31 October	Eleanor Ward
1954	1 November – 31 December	–
1955	1 January – 28 February	Phyllis Johnson
1955	1 March – 30 April	Rita Rogers
1955	1 May – 30 June	–
1955	1 July – 31 August	–
1955	1 September – 31 October	Sue Rabinowitz
1955	1 November – 31 December	Marie Leonard
1956	1 January – 28 February	Loretta Bomba
1956	1 March – 30 April	Kathleen Walshe
1956	1 May – 30 June	Lois Kean
1956	1 July – 31 August	Nancy Seris
1956	1 September – 31 October	Eleanor Ward
1956	1 November – 31 December	Doris Mermel
1957	1 January – 28 February	Marie Crittenden
1957	1 March – 30 April	Madeleine Seelig
1957	1 May – 30 June	–
1957	1 July – 31 August	–
1957	1 September – 31 October	–
1957	1 November – 31 December	–
1958	1 January – 28 February	Nancy Denison
1958	1 March – 30 April	Eleanor Galanis
1958	1 May – 30 June	Lynne Galvin
1958	1 July – 31 August	Helen Steinacher
1958	1 September – 31 October	Kathryn Keeler
1958	1 September – 31 October	Mary Keeler
1958	1 November – 31 December	Josephine Milici
1959	1 January – 28 February	Adrienne Marie Cella
1959	1 March – 30 April	Ellen Hart
1959	1 May – 30 June	Sheila Stein
1959	1 May – 30 June	Joyce Griffin
1959	1 May – 30 June	Sally Salve
1959	1 May – 30 June	Gail Burke
1959	1 July – 31 August	–
1959	1 September – 31 October	–
1959	1 November – 31 December	–
1960	1 January – 29 February	Deanne Goldman
1960	1 March – 30 April	Peggy Kelly
1960	1 May – 30 June	Shirley Martin
1960	1 July – 31 August	Barbara Butler
1960	1 September – 31 October	Elizabeth Stern
1960	1 November – 31 December	Eleanor Nash
1961	1 January – 28 February	Dolores Mitchell
1961	1 March – 30 April	Joan Raftery
1961	1 May – 30 June	Judie Shaktman
1961	1 May – 30 June	Kathy Dempsey
1961	1 July – 31 August	Kathy Pregenzer
1961	1 September – 31 October	Vernell Dennis
1961	1 November – 31 December	Stella Deere
1962	1 January – 28 February	Evelyn Tasch
1962	1 March – 30 April	Dorothy Callaghan
1962	1 May – 30 June	Sue Collins
1962	1 July – 31 August	Barbara Sheehan
1962	1 September – 31 October	Sally Pishney
1962	1 November – 31 December	Mary Baston
1963	1 January – 28 February	Ann Napolitano
1963	1 March – 30 April	–
1963	1 May – 30 June	–
1963	1 July – 31 August	–
1963	1 September – 31 October	Carole Nealon
1963	1 November – 31 December	–
1963	–	Diana Wallach
1964	1 January – 29 February	Sanora Selsey
1965	–	Judith Marshall
1965	1 July – 30 August	Rosalind Cinclini
1966	–	Carol Price
1966	–	Donna DeMarta
1967	–	Barbara Preer
1967	–	WyNona Blackman
1967	1 December – 31 January 1968	Neddy Garde
1968	1 February – 31 August	Maureen Walsh
1969	–	Eileen Ryan
1971	1 January – 30 June	Patricia Shilling
1971	1 January – 30 June	Linda Heilbronn
1972	–	Judith Burgess
1973	–	Laurie Brill
1973	–	Ruth Zalduondo
1973	1 November – 30 April 1974	Carol Brown
1974	1 May – 31 July	Sonia Dominguez
1974	1 November – 30 April 1975	Marcia Kilpatrick
1975	1 May – 31 October	Ayana Lawson
1975	1 November – 30 April 1976	Josephine Lazzaro
1976	1 May – 31 October	Heide Hafner
2004	–	Caroline Sanchez-Bernat (honorary)

=== Revival ===
Year	Winner	Represented
2017	Lisa Levy	–
2018	Parker MacLure	–
2019	Dylan Greenberg	–
2023	Harmony "Hardcore" Vehling	7 Train
2024	Queerly Femmetastic	A Train
2025	Bimini Cricket	B Train
2026	Abby Fantastic	A Train

== In popular culture ==
- In the 1944 musical On the Town, one of the main characters falls in love with "Miss Turnstiles" after seeing her picture on the subway. Lyricist Betty Comden later claimed that the musical influenced the contest's selection process to include more diverse contestants, due to the casting of the half-Japanese Sono Osato as Miss Turnstiles in the original production.
- Lawrence Ferlinghetti's poetry collection A Coney Island of the Mind contains a poem entitled "Meet Miss Subways."
- Donald Sosin's 1972 song cycle "Third Rail" includes the entire text of a Miss Subways poster, but with the name of the girl and her school changed at her request.
- Cher's 1974 album, Dark Lady, featured the comedic song, "Miss Subway of 1952," written by Mary F. Cain, about a once-beautiful woman who has not aged gracefully.
- In the 1996 The Nanny episode "Tattoo" (Season 4 episode 9), Fran claims to have won the Miss Subways title.
- In 1996, Marga Gomez debuted a show called "A Line Around the Block" in which a character says, "You're Miss America. No, better than that. Miss Subways."
- The 2018 historical fiction novel The Subway Girls (St. Martin's Press) by Susie Orman Schnall features a dual-timeline story of a 1949 Miss Subways contestant and a modern-day female advertising executive.
- In the 2018 novel Miss Subways (ISBN 978-0-37421-040-3, Macmillan Publishers), writer and actor David Duchovny re-imagines Miss Subways as Emer, a New York City teacher whose world intersects with mythical figures in her quest for love.
