= The Happy Organ =

Single by Dave "Baby" Cortez

from the album The Happy Organ
- B-side: "Love Me as I Love You"
- Released: 1959
- Recorded: 1958
- Genre: Instrumental rock; R&B
- Length: 2:06
- Label: Clock
- Songwriters: Dave "Baby" Cortez, James J. Kriegsmann, Ken Wood

Dave "Baby" Cortez singles chronology
"The Happy Organ" (1959)	"The Whistling Organ" (1959)

"The Happy Organ" is an instrumental composition made famous by Dave "Baby" Cortez in 1959. Cortez co-composed it with noted celebrity photographer James J. Kriegsmann and frequent collaborator Ken Wood. A significant portion of the tune bears a strong resemblance to the traditional "Shortnin' Bread" tune. The record topped the Billboard Hot 100 on 11 May 1959 and also reached #5 on Billboard's R&B chart. In Canada, the song reached #6.

"The Happy Organ" originally featured lyrics and was intended to be sung accompanied by a piano and an organ. Cortez recorded a vocal for it, but was unhappy with the result. He spotted a Hammond B3 organ in the studio and decided to play the song's melody on it. He also brought in studio drummer, Gary Hammond, to provide percussion. The guitar solo is by session musician Wild Jimmy Spruill. Hearing an organ on a rock or R&B song at the time was unusual, but Cortez helped popularize its use outside of the jazz field.

The piece was Cortez' second single for Clock Records, a New York indie launched in 1958. The next week, the Hot 100's #1 was Wilbert Harrison's cover of "Kansas City", which also included Spruill's guitar. Doug Moody soon left Clock to start up Mystic Records in Hollywood, and Cortez took his next hit, "Rinky Dink", to Chess Records.

== Charts ==
Chart (1959)	Peak position
CAN CHUM	6
US Billboard Hot 100	1

== See also ==
- List of Billboard Hot 100 number ones of 1959
