= I Was a Fool (disambiguation) =

"I Was a Fool" is a 2013 song by Tegan and Sara

I Was a Fool may also refer to:

- "I Was A Fool", song by Elmore James and His Broomdusters, E. James & Josea 1955
- "I Was a Fool", song by June Christy 1953, Dan Belloc and His Orchestra, Watson, Belloc, Douglas 1953
- "I Was A Fool", song by Frankie Vaughan, Frank Abelson 1960
- "I Was A Fool", song by The Impalas, Dominic Chiaiavalli 1959
- "I Was A Fool", song by Johnnie Allan 1978, originally written Tommy Stiglets 1959, Johnny Fairchild and The Nite Riders
- "I Was A Fool", song by Roy Orbison, written Orbison, from Roy Orbison's Sun Recordings 1957 covered by Ken Cook 1958
- "I Was A Fool", song by Larry Williams, Williams 1958
- "I Was A Fool", song by Rockhouse, Bob Plumb 1980
- "I Was A Fool", song by Roland Stone, Fairchild, Angle 1962
- "I Was A Fool", song by Ted Herold - 1988
- "I Was A Fool", song by Tom Jones, Myron, Byron 1965
- "I Was A Fool", song by Sunflower Bean from Twentytwo in Blue 2018
- "I Was a Fool (To Let You Go)", song by Barry Manilow from Even Now
