= Judith Marshall =

British entomologist

- Born: Judith Meadows
- Partner: John Marshall (eye laser scientist)
- Scientific career
- Fields: Entomology; Orthopterology
- Institutions: Natural History Museum, London

Judith A. Marshall is an entomologist in the UK. She is an expert in grasshoppers, crickets and related insects (Orthoptera) and is emeritus Curator of Entomology at the Natural History Museum, London.

== Career ==
Marshall has a BSc in Zoology, and joined the Natural History Museum in 1964 as assistant experimental officer. After a long career at the museum, she retired in 2003 as curator of entomology, but continues work as emeritus.

She is Chairman of the Phasmid Study Group, is a member of the Grasshopper specialists group of the International Union for Conservation of Nature, and co-convenes the Royal Entomological Society's Orthoptera Special Interest Group.

== Books ==
Marshall has written several books on the British orthoptera fauna:

- Grasshoppers and Allied Insects of Great Britain and Ireland, with E. Chris. M. Haes, published by Harley books in 1990.
- Grasshoppers, with illustrator Denys Ovenden, published by the Field Studies Council in 1999.
- Chapters 10 to 13, in Identifying British Insects and Arachnids: An Annotated Bibliography of Key Works, edited by Peter Barnard published by Cambridge University Press in 1999.
- Chapter 29 Grasshoppers, crickets and allied insects, in Silent Summer: The State of Wildlife in Britain and Ireland, edited by Normal Maclean, published by Cambridge University Press in 2010.
