= Wild Jimmy Spruill =

American guitarist (1934–1996)

James Edgar Spruill (June 9, 1934 – February 3, 1996), also known as Wild Jimmy Spruill, was an American New York based session guitarist, whose guitar solos featured on many rhythm and blues and pop hits of the 1950s and 1960s.

== Biography ==
=== Early life and success ===
Spruill was born into a sharecropping family in Fayetteville, North Carolina, United States. As a child he listened to both country music and blues. He learned to play guitar, first with a cigar box guitar with an elastic band, and then graduated within a few years to a Fender Telecaster and Standel amplifier. Later in his career, he took to playing a Gibson Les Paul which he "modified" by sawing off most of the body.

He moved to New York City in 1955, and began working as a session musician. He most frequently worked for the record producers Danny and Bobby Robinson, who ran the Fire, Fury, Everlast, Enjoy and VIM record labels based at Bobby Robinson's Happy House of Hits record store in Harlem. He also worked for the Old Town, Vanguard and other New York-based labels, and appeared on records by King Curtis, Little Anthony and the Imperials, the Shirelles, Tarheel Slim, and Elmore James, as well as releasing singles under his own name.

In May 1959 "The Happy Organ" by Dave "Baby" Cortez reached the top of the Billboard pop chart and was succeeded, the following week, by Wilbert Harrison's "Kansas City"; both records featured guitar solos by Spruill. Another well-known recording on which Spruill plays is "Fannie Mae" by Buster Brown, which hit the top of the R&B charts in early 1960. In 1961, he featured on Bobby Lewis's no.1 hit "Tossin' and Turnin'", and at the same time featured on The Shirelles' "Dedicated to the One I Love", which peaked at no.3.

Spruill was a showman, known for playing guitar with his teeth. His sound was unconventional, notable for its hard attack and sense of freedom, unexpectedly going from assertive lead parts to rhythmically dynamic, scratching rhythms. Among his most interesting solo records is "Hard Grind" (Fire 1006), which was originally issued as the B-side to "Kansas City March". Other solo sides include "Cut and Dried", "Scratchin' Twist", and "Slow Draggin".

=== Later life and death ===
Spruill formed an East Coast nightclub trio in the mid-1960s, with singer Tommy Knight and drummer Popsy Dixon (now with The Holmes Brothers). In the 1970s and 1980s, he worked as an interior decorator in New York City, working occasional music gigs when the opportunity arose, and made, at least, one European tour with guitarist/singer Larry Dale and pianist/singer Bob Gaddy; whose older records he had played on. He died in February 1996 from a heart attack while traveling on a bus from Florida, where he had been visiting his family and saxophonist Noble "Thin Man" Watts, back to his home in The Bronx. He was 61 years old.

== Chartings as session player ==
Artist	Song title	Date	US charts	R&B US charts	Miscellaneous
Wilbert Harrison	"Kansas City"	1959	1	1	
Storey Sisters	“Bad Motorcycle”	1958			
Dave "Baby" Cortez	“The Happy Organ”	1959	1	5	
Little Anthony and the Imperials	“So Much”	1959	87	24	
Tarheel Slim and Little Ann	"It’s Too Late"	1959		20	
Buster Brown	“Fannie Mae”	1960	38	1	
Bobby Marchan	"There’s Something On Your Mind"	1960		1	
Maxine Brown	"All In My Mind"	1961	19	2	
Lee Dorsey	“Ya Ya”	1961	7	1	
Bobby Lewis	“Tossin' and Turnin'”	1961	1	1	
The Shirelles	“Dedicated to the One I Love”	1961	3	2	
Solomon Burke	"Down in the Valley"	1962	71	20	Initially the B-side of “I’m Hanging Up My Heart For You”
Solomon Burke	“I’m Hanging Up My Heart For You”	1962	85	15	

== Legacy ==
Spruill's work may be found on a number of compilation albums, including the following:

- Great R&B Instrumentals, Ace Records: 819 ("Hard Grind")
- N.Y. Wild Guitars, (P-Vine) (Japanese compilation)
- Scratch 'n Twist: Rare And Unissued New York Rhythm And Blues 1956-1962, Night Train International: NTI CD 7150
- Scratchin': The Wild Jimmy Spruill Story: GVC2039 released in 2014
