= Willie Hall (pianist) =

New Orleans blues and boogie woogie piano player

Willie Hall (died 1930), best known by his nickname Drive 'Em Down, was a New Orleans blues and boogie woogie piano player. He never recorded, but has had a great influence on blues and rock and roll.

According to Champion Jack Dupree, who called Drive 'Em Down his "father" and cited him as "teaching me his style", Hall played in barrelhouses. His earthy song, "Junker's Blues", with its stories about needles and reefer and the Angola prison farm was recorded by Dupree in 1940. In 1949 Fats Domino reworked the song as "The Fat Man", the first of his 35 Top 40 hits. The melody was used by Professor Longhair for "Tipitina" and by Lloyd Price for "Lawdy Miss Clawdy." Willy DeVille recorded the song in 1990 on his Victory Mixture album. The song also directly inspired the song "Junco Partner", first recorded in 1951 by James Waynes and later also widely covered by other musicians.
