= Norman Maclean (disambiguation) =

Norman Maclean (1902–1990) was an American author and scholar.

Norman Maclean may also refer to:

- Tormod MacGill-Eain (Norman Hector Mackinnon Maclean, 1936–2017), Scottish Gaelic comedian
- Norman Maclean (moderator) (1869–1952), Scottish minister and religious author
- Norman Maclean (biologist) (born 1932), professor of genetics
- Norman J. MacLean (1920–2000), Canadian politician

== See also ==
- Norman McLean (1865–1947), Scottish Semitic and Biblical scholar
- Norm McLean (1896–1980), Australian rules footballer
- Norman Mac Lean (1930-2015), Canadian-American sportswriter
- Norm MacLean (Fallout), character in TV series
