= Dave "Baby" Cortez =

American pop keyboardist (1938–2022)

- Born: David Cortez Clowney; August 13, 1938; Detroit, Michigan, U.S.
- Died: May 31, 2022 (aged 83) New York City, U.S.
- Genres: Pop, R&B
- Occupations: Organist, pianist
- Instruments: Piano, organ
- Years active: 1956–1973; 2009–2011
- Labels: Clock Records, Chess Records, Paris

David Cortez Clowney (August 13, 1938 – May 31, 2022), known by the stage name Dave "Baby" Cortez, was an American pop and R&B organist and pianist, best known for his 1959 hit, "The Happy Organ".

== Early life ==
David Cortez Clowney was born in Detroit on August 13, 1938, and attended Northwestern High School in the city. His father played the piano, and encouraged him to pursue a musical career. Clowney played the piano for 10 years, then he took up the organ.

== Career ==
Clowney made his first record in 1956 under his own name, and also sang with two doo-wop groups, the Pearls and the Valentines, in the mid-1950s. He was well known in black pop-music circles as the musical director for Little Anthony and the Imperials. Clowney was scheduled to record his original song "The Happy Organ" during a 1959 recording session. The microphones were positioned for a vocal, but Clowney demurred: "I didn't like the vocal, because I'm not a great singer," he recalled in 2012. He noticed a Hammond electric organ sitting unused in a corner of the studio. "Usually, when you go into a studio, they have the Hammond organ covered up. People weren't using it then, except in gospel, mostly. I said, 'Let me try this thing here.'"

"The Happy Organ" was the first pop/rock hit to feature the electronic organ as lead instrument; it featured drummer Gary Hammond and was co-written by the celebrity photographer James J. Kriegsmann and frequent collaborator Kurt Wood. The guitar solo was by session musician Wild Jimmy Spruill. The record, crediting Clowney as Dave "Baby" Cortez, was the first instrumental No. 1 on Billboard magazine's Hot 100 chart. The original 45-rpm single was released on the independent Clock Records label, but the LP which featured it was released by RCA Victor by arrangement with Clock.

Cortez had another Top Ten hit in 1962 with "Rinky Dink" on Chess Records. This record became well known in the UK as the signature tune of the Saturday afternoon program Professional Wrestling, introduced by Kent Walton, although few knew the name of the tune or the artist. The song has a strong resemblance to 1957's "Love Is Strange" by Mickey & Sylvia, since it used the same guitar riff. After changing his focus to vocals and recording the minor hit, "Unaddressed Letter", he had his final pop hit in 1973, with "Someone Has Taken Your Place", on the All Platinum label.

== Later life and death ==
Cortez subsequently left the music industry, which he did not feel respected within. He led an extremely private life over the following decades, variously in New York City and Cincinnati. His complete living and employment history is unknown, but at one point, he was the organist for a Cincinnati church. In 2009, Norton Records co-founder Miriam Linna tracked him down and asked him to return to recording. In 2011, after a 38-year hiatus, Cortez returned with a new album on Norton Records backed by Lonnie Youngblood and His Bloodhounds, including underground luminary Mick Collins of the Dirtbombs and the Gories. The following year, he agreed to give a rare video interview discussing his musical career.

Cortez lived latterly in The Bronx, New York City. He had a daughter who he was not in regular contact with, though this was not due to estrangement, but because he was highly reclusive. Thus, when he died at his home on May 31, 2022, at the age of 83, she only later learned of his death through Broadcast Music, Inc., which handled his songwriting royalties. As no surviving family were available to claim the body at the time, he was interred in the potter's field at Hart Island. Cortez's death was not publicly reported until July 2025.

== Discography ==
=== Albums ===
- Dave "Baby" Cortez and His Happy Organ (RCA Records, 1959)
- Dave "Baby" Cortez (Clock Records, 1960)
- The Fabulous Organ of Dave "Baby" Cortez (Metro Records, 1960)
- Music 'Round the Clock (Clock, 1961)
- Rinky Dink (Chess Records, 1962)
- Organ Shindig (Roulette Records, 1965)
- Tweety Pie (Roulette, 1966)
- In Orbit with Dave "Baby" Cortez (Roulette, 1966)
- Baby Cortez the Isley Brothers Way (T-Neck Records, 1970)
- Soul Vibration (All Platinum Records, 1972)
- With Lonnie Youngblood and His Bloodhounds (Norton Records, 2011)

=== Chart singles ===
| Year | Single | Chart Positions | | | | |
| Year | Single | US Pop | US R&B | Canada | Label | Release Date |
|---|---|---|---|---|---|---|
| 1959 | "The Happy Organ" | 1 | 5 | 6 | Clock | February 19, 1959 |
| 1959 | "The Whistling Organ" | 61 | - | - | Clock | May 25, 1959 |
| 1962 | "Rinky Dink" | 10 | 9 | 6 | Julia / Chess | June 19, 1962 |
| 1962 | "Happy Weekend" | 67 | - | 32 | Chess | September 21, 1962 |
| 1962 | "Fiesta" | 96 | - | - | Emit | September 28, 1962 |
| 1963 | "Hot Cakes!" | 91 | - | - | Chess | March 11, 1963 |
| 1963 | "Organ Shout" | 76 | - | - | Chess | July 21, 1963 |
| 1966 | "Count Down" | 91 | - | - | Roulette | May 12, 1966 |
| 1973 | "Someone Has Taken Your Place" | - | 45 | - | All Platinum | April 13, 1973 |
