= Bob Gaddy =

American singer

Background information
- Born: February 4, 1924; Vivian, West Virginia, United States
- Died: July 24, 1997 (aged 73); The Bronx, New York, United States
- Genres: East Coast blues, rhythm and blues
- Occupations: Pianist, singer, songwriter
- Instruments: Piano, vocals
- Years active: 1947–1997
- Label: Various

Bob Gaddy (February 4, 1924 – July 24, 1997) was an American East Coast blues and rhythm-and-blues pianist, singer and songwriter. He is best remembered for his recordings of "Operator" and "Rip and Run," and musical work he undertook with Larry Dale, Wild Jimmy Spruill, Sonny Terry and Brownie McGhee.

== Biography ==
Gaddy was born in Vivian, West Virginia, a small town based on coal mining. He learned to play the piano at an early age, playing and singing in his local church. In 1943, he was conscripted and served in the Navy, being stationed in California. He progressed from learning the blues and, using his gospel background, graduated towards the boogie-woogie playing style.

He played in blues clubs in Oakland and San Francisco, but after World War II ended he relocated to New York, in 1946. Gaddy later commented, "I came to New York just to visit, because I was on my way to the West Coast. Somehow or other, I just got hooked on it. New York got into my system and I've been stuck here ever since."

He found work as a blues pianist, and in the late 1940s, provided accompaniment to both Brownie McGhee and Sonny Terry. He later backed Larry Dale, and befriended Champion Jack Dupree. Dupree wrote "Operator" for Gaddy, one of his best-selling numbers. Gaddy first record for Jackson Records; his debut single, "Bicycle Boogie", was released in 1952. He later recorded for the Jax, Dot and Harlem record labels, before joining Hy Weiss's Old Town Records in 1956. It was here that Gaddy had his most commercially successful period, particularly with "I Love My Baby", "Paper Lady", and "Rip and Run". For Gaddy's early recordings, McGhee was often in the recording studio with him; for his Old Town recordings, he used the guitarists Jimmy Spruill and Joe Ruffin and the saxophonist Jimmy Wright.

Gaddy stopped recording around 1960. However, along with his longtime friend Larry Dale, he remained a mainstay of the ongoing New York blues scene.

In April 1988, Gaddy, Dale and Spruill reunited to play at the Tramps nightclub in New York.

Gaddy died of lung cancer in July 1997, at the age of 73, in the Bronx, New York.

== Discography ==
=== Singles ===
- "I (Believe You Got a Sidekick)" / "Bicycle Boogie", Bob Gaddy & His Alley Cats (1952), Jackson Records
- "No Help Wanted" / "Little Girl's Boogie", Bob Gaddy & His Alley Cats (1953), Jax Records
- "Evil Man Blues" / "Doctor Gaddy's Blues", Doctor Gaddy & His Orchestra (1954), Dot Records
- "Blues Has Walked in My Room" / "Slow Down Baby" (1955) - Harlem Records -
- "Operator" / "I Love My Baby", Doctor Gaddy & His Keys (1956), Old Town Records
- "Paper Lady" / "Out of My Name", Doctor Gaddy & His Keys (1957), Old Town Records
- "Woe Woe Is Me" / "Rip and Run", Doctor Gaddy & His Keys (1958), Old Town Records
- "Take My Advice" / "You Are the One" (1959), Old Town Records
- "Till the Day I Die"/ "I'll Go My Way" (1959), Old Town Records

=== Compilation albums ===
- Rip and Run (1986), Ace
- Bob Gaddy & Friends: Bicycle Boogie 1947–1960 (1987), Moonshine
- Harlem Blues Operator (1995), Ace
- Alone with the Blues (2026) Blues Fidelity

== See also ==
- List of East Coast blues musicians
