= Forever and Ever (Champion Jack Dupree album) =

Studio album by Champion Jack Dupree
- Released: 1991
- Studio: Magic Shop, New York City
- Genre: Blues
- Label: Bullseye Blues
- Producer: Ron Levy

Champion Jack Dupree chronology
| Back Home in New Orleans (1990) | Forever and Ever (1991) | One Last Time (1993) |

Forever and Ever is an album by the American musician Champion Jack Dupree, released in 1991. It was his second album for Bullseye Blues and the last one released during his lifetime. The album won a W. C. Handy Award.

== Production ==
Produced by Ron Levy, the album was recorded in New Orleans. "Third Degree" was written by Eddie Boyd. Bo Dollis duetted with Dupree on "Yella Pocahontas". The title track is about embracing the end of one's life.

== Critical reception ==
Professional ratings
Review scores
| Source | Rating |
|---|---|
| AllMusic | 2.5/5 stars |
| Boston Herald | A |
| Robert Christgau | A− |
| The Encyclopedia of Popular Music | 3/5 stars |
| The Penguin Guide to Blues Recordings | 2.5/4 stars |

The Press of Atlantic City called Dupree "a New Orleans treasure whose music connects directly with the tones of Prof. Longhair and Dr. John." The Washington Post wrote that the album "alludes to some of his other Crescent City alliances... Yet the reminiscences, like the music itself, flow freely, without the slightest hint of prodding or preparation." The Boston Herald concluded: "Mixing barrelhouse, New Orleans and single-note blues styles with plenty of space and a booming voice that sounded aged in brine, this New Orleans native ... was proof that the real blues don't need any reviving."

OffBeat deemed Forever and Ever "a modern blues masterpiece," writing that "Jack is relaxed and swinging with a New Orleans groove that puts the music so far back in the alley where even rats fear to tread." Robert Christgau facetiously called Dupree "a dirty old man in fine fettle entertaining the room... And for sure his age is part of the charm."

== Track listing ==
| No. | Title | Length |
|---|---|---|
| 1. | "They Gave Me Away" |
| 2. | "Hometown New Orleans" |
| 3. | "Skit Skat" |
| 4. | "Poor Boy" |
| 5. | "Forever and Ever" |
| 6. | "Yella Pocahontas" |
| 7. | "Third Degree" |
| 8. | "Dupree Special" |
| 9. | "Let's Talk It Over" |
