= Junker Blues =

Song by Champion Jack Dupree
- A-side: "My Cabin Inn"
- B-side: "Junker Blues"
- Published: 1940
- Released: 1941
- Recorded: 28 January 1941
- Genre: piano blues
- Length: 2:43
- Label: Okeh 06152
- Songwriter(s): Dupree (credited)
- Composer(s): Willie Hall

Junker Blues is a piano blues song first recorded in early 1941 by Champion Jack Dupree. It formed the basis of several later songs, including "The Fat Man" by Fats Domino (1949) and "Lawdy Miss Clawdy" by Lloyd Price (1952). The original song is about a drug user's conflicts with life and the law, making reference to cocaine, "needles", "reefers", and life in the penitentiary; and contains admonishments against the use of hard drugs.

== History ==
The song was written sometime in the 1920s by Willie Hall, a barrelhouse blues and boogie-woogie pianist from New Orleans who was known as Willie 'Drive 'em Down' Hall. He never recorded, nor did he receive initial credit for this song. Champion Jack Dupree, who was orphaned as a child and was mentored by Hall, often referred to the elder musician as his "father".

Dupree was the first to record "Junker Blues", on January 28, 1941, in Chicago for Okeh Records; its eventual A-side, “My Cabin Inn”, had been recorded five days earlier. Both tracks feature Dupree on piano and vocals, and either Wilson Swain or Ransom Knowling on bass. They were released the following year on Okeh 06152, credited to Dupree as composer.

In 1958, Dupree released a different version of the song, "Junker's Blues", with lyrics focusing on the allure of hard drugs, on his first album, Blues from the Gutter.

== Covers ==
Fats Domino attracted national attention to the song (Junker Blues) by varying the tune, changing the lyrics and calling it "The Fat Man". Domino recorded the song for Imperial Records in Cosimo Matassa's J&M studio on Rampart Street in New Orleans, Louisiana on Saturday, 10 December 1949. The song, an example of early rock and roll, features a rolling piano with Domino doing "wah-wah" vocalizing over a fat back beat. The recording sold over a million copies, and is widely regarded as the first rock and roll record to do so.

According to some sources, the original version, Junker Blues, served as a template for the 1951 song, "Junco Partner". Other sources however claim that "Junco Partner" was the 'national anthem' of the Louisiana State Penitentiary at Angola; and that with each inmate being required, as a rite of passage, to contribute, there are more than 3,000 verses to "Junco Partner".

Lloyd Price used the melody of "Junker Blues" in 1952 for his song, "Lawdy Miss Clawdy", as did Professor Longhair in 1953 for "Tipitina", for Atlantic Records that same year. A newer recording of Professor Longhair's "Tipitina", was later released on his album, New Orleans Piano, in 1972. Smiley Lewis's "Tee-Nah-Nah" was yet another close copy.

In 1990, Willy DeVille recorded Dupree's 1958 "Junker's Blues" for his Victory Mixture album. English actor and vocalist Hugh Laurie covered "Junker's Blues" on his 2013 album, Didn't It Rain.

== See also ==
- Junco Partner
