= John Marshall (eye laser scientist) =

British medical scientist and inventor

Professor John Marshall MBE FMedSci FRCPath FRSB
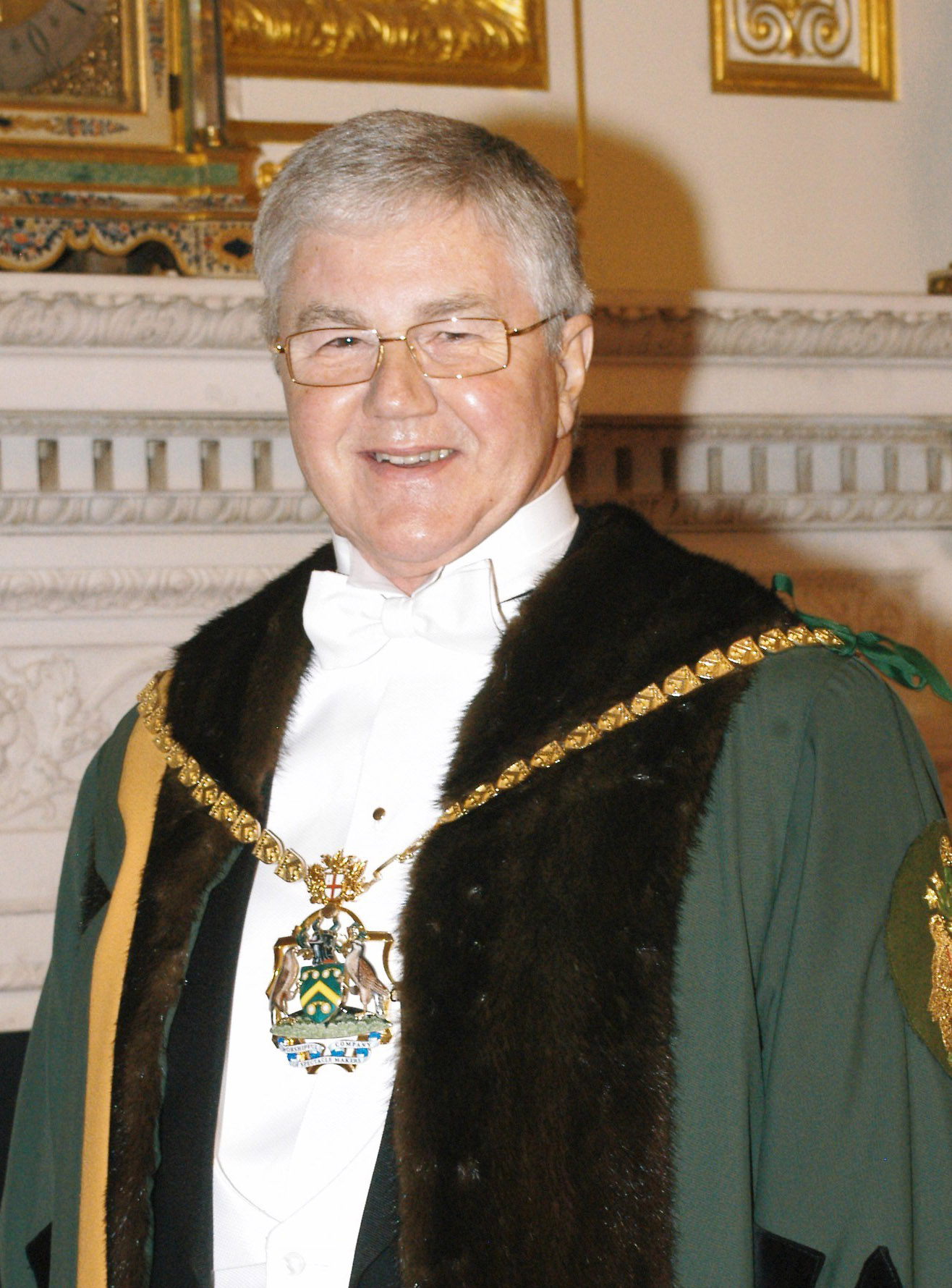
- Marshall as Master of the Worshipful Company of Spectacle Makers, 2011–12

Frost Professor of Ophthalmology, Institute of Ophthalmology
- In office 2011–2013

Frost Professor of Ophthalmology, King's College, London
- In office 1991–2009

Sembal Professor of Experimental Ophthalmology, King's College, London
- In office 1983–1991

Personal details
- Born: 21 December 1943 (age 82) Woking, Surrey, England

John Marshall (born 21 December 1943, Woking, England) is a British medical scientist and inventor. He is Emeritus Professor of Ophthalmology at the UCL Institute of Ophthalmology and at King's College London. He is a pioneer of laser eye surgery.

== Education ==
Marshall's earliest years were in war torn London, prior to moving to St Pauls Cray near Orpington in Kent. He had primary tuberculosis as a child and spent some years away from the family in a variety of sanatoriums and as a consequence was late starting school at the age of seven. He graduated with a BSc in Zoology from Sir John Cass College, London in 1965 and then began his 50-year career in eye research starting at the Institute of Ophthalmology. In 1968 he was awarded a PhD (Medicine anatomy) from the University of London for a thesis entitled "Laser-induced damage in the retina". His postgraduate supervisor was Kit Pedler, known for creating the cybermen of Doctor Who fame.

== Career and research ==
In 1983 he became Sembal Professor of Experimental Ophthalmology at the Institute of Ophthalmology then based in Judd Street, London. In 1991 he moved to St Thomas' Hospital, UMDS to become the Frost Professor of Ophthalmology, honorary consultant and Head of Department of Ophthalmology. He has published extensively in the field of ophthalmology, on a broad range of ocular problems. This has included age-related, diabetic and inherited retinal disease; lens and intraocular lens design, development of lasers for diagnosis and surgery, light and ageing, refractive surgery and problems of the vitreous and glaucoma. He produced and patented the revolutionary Excimer laser, the grandfather patent for corneal laser refractive surgery He also created the world's first Diode laser for treating eye problems of diabetes, glaucoma and ageing. He has sat on and chaired many national and international committees* concerned with protecting the public against the possible damaging effects of lasers and other artificial light sources and played a leading role with the ICRC and addressed the United Nations to successfully obtain a Geneva Convention banning the use of anti-personnel laser weapons. He is a frequent lecturer at international and national ophthalmology meetings and has successfully supervised 60 candidates for higher doctorate degrees.

- *World Health Organisation (WHO), Non-ionizing Radiation Committee of the International Radiological Protection Association, International Electro-Technical Commission (IEC), British Standards Institution (BSI) European Community (EC), International Committee of the Red Cross (ICRC), National Radiological Protection Board (NRPB), All Party Parliamentary Group on Refractive Surgery

Marshall is also a past master and on the court of the Worshipful Company of Spectacle Makers, Trustee of the Frost Foundation, Trustee of Retina UK (formerly RP Fighting Blindness), Ambassador for Fight For Sight and Vice-president of the National Eye Research Center (now Sight Research UK).

== Industry ==
He has chaired and served on the Medical Advisory Boards of many companies in the field of ophthalmology, including Avellino, Avedro, Summitt Technology Inc, Intralase, Diomed and Ellex.

- Inventor of excimer laser technology for refractive surgery which formed basis of patent portfolio for "Summit Technology", acquired by Alcon in 2000. In excess of 50 million procedures now having been undertaken worldwide.
- Co-inventor of world's first diode laser for ophthalmology and member of industrial design group that progressed device through to commercialisation (1988)
- Co-founder of Diomed, a UK company that was the world's largest supplier of diode laser devices for medical use. board member and Chairman of Medical Advisory Board until 1999.
- Co-inventor and founder member of Odyssey Optical Systems, a company formed to commercially exploit devices to image the interior of the eye.
- Co-inventor of hardware and optic disc recognition software used in a security-based biometric analysis for Retinal Technologies inc. Founder member of the Company. (2000, Optic disc biometric)
- Co-inventor Retinal rejuvenation –a new Laser treatment for early age related macular degeneration (AMD) and Diabetic Macular edema (DME) (2008)
- Co-inventor Diagnostic method and apparatus for predicting potential preserved visual acuity (2009)
- Co-inventor Eye therapy – the use of cross-linking agents on the cornea (2011)

== Recognition, honours and awards ==
- 1980 Nettleship Medal of the Ophthalmological Society of the United Kingdom
- 1985 Mackenzie Medal (Tennant Institute of Ophthalmology, Glasgow)
- 1988 Rayner Medal (UKISCRS)
- 1989 Life Fellow of the Royal Society of Arts
- 1990 Ridley Medal ESCRS
- 1991 Fellow of the Royal Society of Medicine
- 1993 Pecs Retinal Award
- 1993 Ashton Medal (Royal College of Ophthalmologists)
- 1993 Parker Heath Award, American Academy of Ophthalmology
- 1997 Elected Honorary Fellow of College of Optometrists
- 1998 Honorary Fellow of the Portuguese Ophthalmological Society
- 1998 Owen Aves Memorial Medal (Bradford, Yorkshire)
- 1999 Wilkening Award, Laser Society of America
- 2000 Distinguished Service Medal, Swedish Medical Society
- 2000 Ida Mann Medal (Oxford)
- 2001 Lord Crook Gold Medal, Worshipful Company of Spectacle Makers
- 2001 Doyne Medal (Oxford Congress)
- 2001 Barraquer Medal, International Society of Refractive Surgeons
- 2003 Elected Fellow of the Laser Institute of America (LIA)
- 2003 EURETINA Award, European Society of Retinal Surgeons (Hamburg)
- 2003 Buckingham Palace Reception, October 2003, for pioneers
- 2004 Charles D Kelman Innovator's Award and medal, ASCRS (San Diego)
- 2004 Lim Medal of the Singapore National Eye Centre (Singapore)
- 2004 Elected Fellow of the European Academy of Ophthalmology
- 2005 Elected Honorary Fellow of Royal College of Ophthalmologists
- 2005 Elected Honorary Fellow of Cardiff University
- 2005 Senior Achievement Award (American Academy of Ophthalmology)
- 2007 Fellow of the Royal College of Pathologists (by publications)
- 2009 Fellow of the Association for Research in Vision and Ophthalmology
- 2009 Elected Fellow of the Academy of Medical Sciences
- 2009 Fellow of the Royal Society of Biology
- 2009 Lifetime Achievement Award, ISCRS & the American Academy of Ophthalmologists
- 2012 Junius-Kuhnt-Award for AMD Research (Düsseldorf)
- 2013 MBE for services to Ophthalmology
- 2013 D.Sc. (Hon) Glasgow Caledonian University
- 2014 International Congress of German Ophthalmic Surgeons (DOC) Bronze medal.
- 2014 Bowman Medal, Royal College of Ophthalmologists
- 2014 Zivojnovic Award, European VitreoRetinal Society
- 2014 Lifetime Achievement Award, UKISCRS
- 2015 D.Sc. (Hon) London Metropolitan University
