= Ellen's Stardust Diner =

1950s theme restaurant on Broadway, New York City

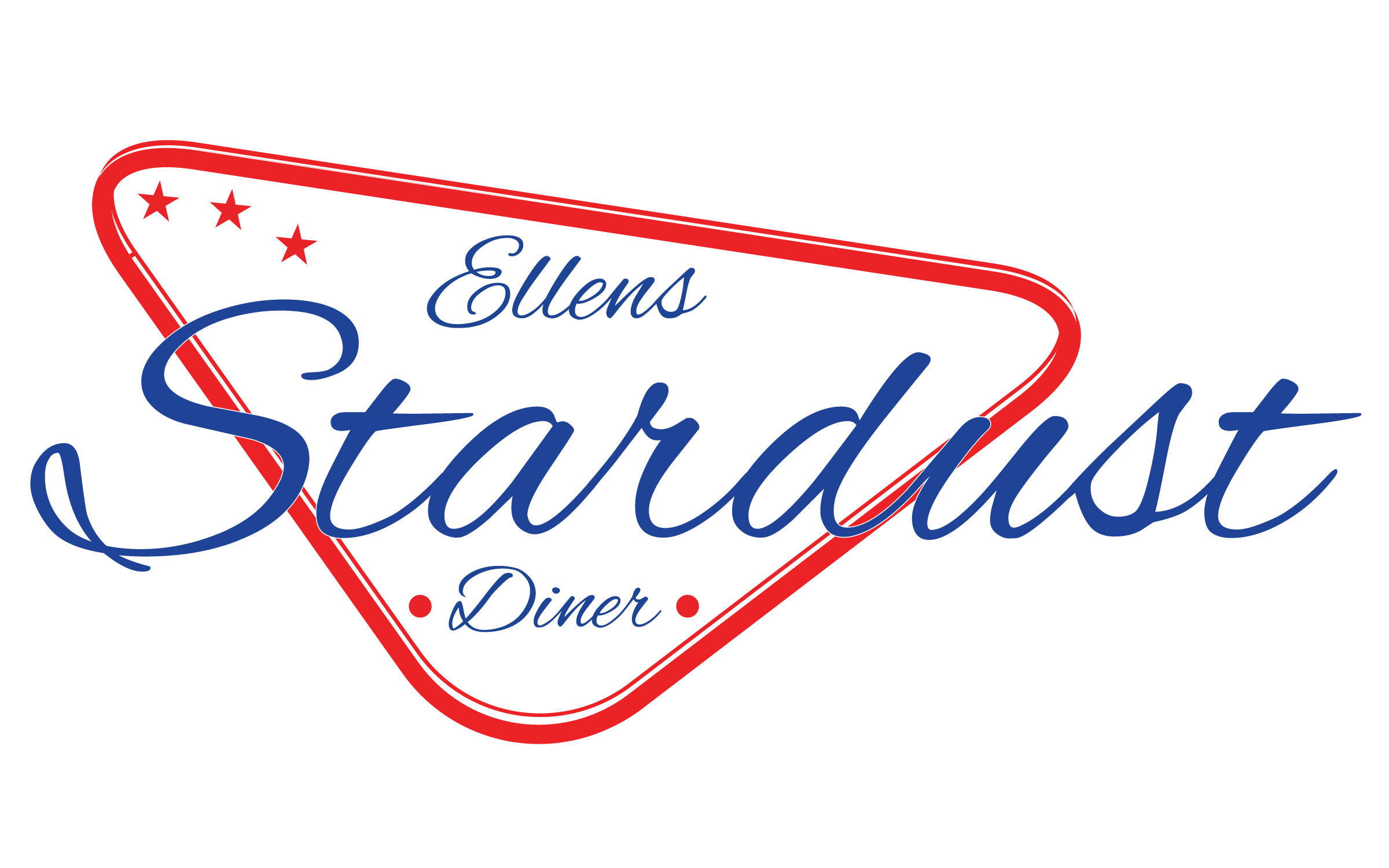

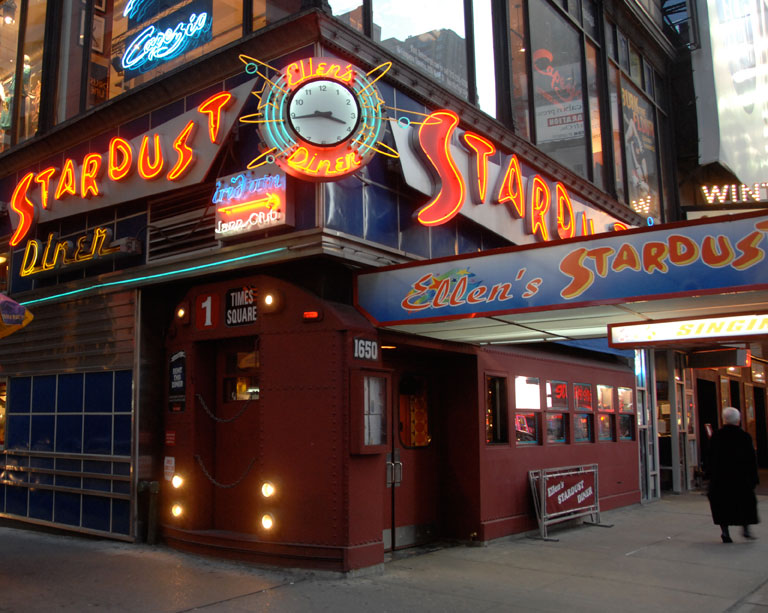
- Interactive map of Ellen's Stardust Diner

Restaurant information
- Established: 1987
- Owner: Ellen Hart
- Food type: American cuisine
- Location: 1650 Broadway (at 51st Street), New York City, New York, New York, 10019, United States
- Coordinates: 40.76182°N 73.9834°W
- Reservations: Not accepted, except private parties and events
- Website: www.ellensstardustdiner.com

Ellen's Stardust Diner is a retro 1950s theme restaurant located at 1650 Broadway on the southeast corner of 51st Street in Theater District, Manhattan, New York City. The diner is regarded as one of the best theme restaurants in New York owing to its singing waitstaff. The diner also contains retro-themed memorabilia such as photos of many past Miss Subways on the walls, an indoor train, a 1956 Predicta television, and a “drive-in theater” screen that showcases performances of the 1950s. It is popular among children and adults.

== History ==
Ellen's Stardust Diner was opened in 1987 after Ellen's Cafe was closed down. It was the first 1950s theme restaurant in New York City and had waitresses in poodle skirts. In the late 1990s, a sister restaurant operated near Times Square under the name Stardust Dine-O-Mat.

During 2016–2017, the restaurant saw a period of unrest, when it was alleged that 31 waiters were fired after attempting to form a union with the Industrial Workers of the World, and the restaurant counter-claimed that the terminated employees had defrauded it of hundreds of thousands of dollars. In October 2017, a settlement was agreed to give the fired workers the opportunity to return to their jobs if they wished, and to give them back pay from the date of their firing. The settlement came about days before the issue was due to come to trial following a decision by the National Labor Relations Board.

== In popular culture ==
Ellen's Stardust Diner was the site in the movie New Year's Eve where Sarah Jessica Parker’s character and her 15-year-old daughter's friends stopped for a bite after the ball dropped. It was also featured in American Idol when a former employee, Devyn Rush, became a contestant on the show. Reports subsequently followed regarding Devyn's employment status at Ellen's Stardust Diner. Ellen's Diner was also featured on a Today Show episode.

== Alumni on Broadway ==
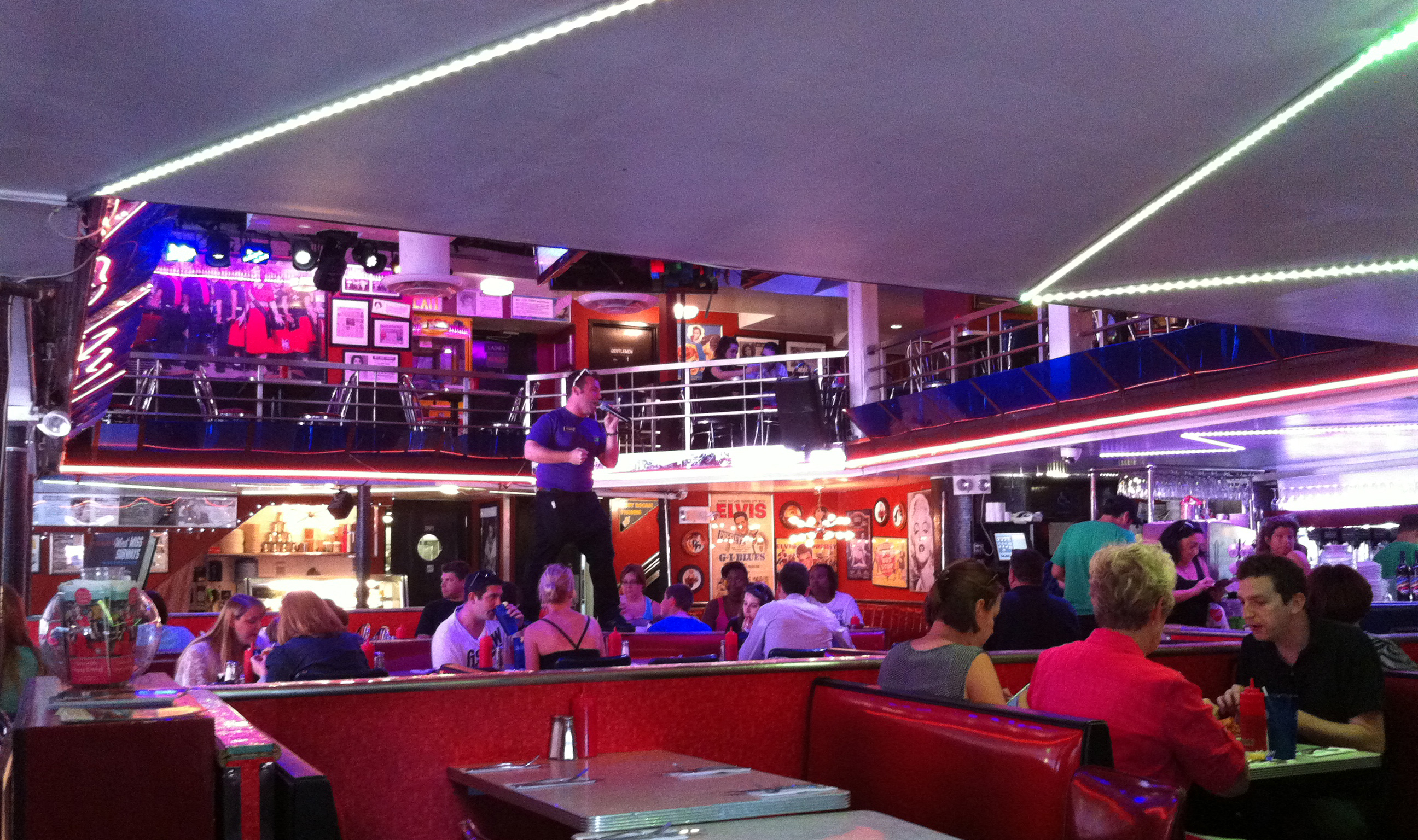
Singer at Ellen's Stardust Diner in 2014.

Several Ellen's Stardust Diner singing waitstaff have gone on to perform in Broadway theatre, including Brandi Massey. In 2013, then-staffers Brandon Ellis, Eric Michael Krop, and Stephen Tyler Davis received critical acclaim for writing or performing in original musicals at the New York Musical Theater Festival. Other former staff have starred or performed in Broadway and major off-Broadway musicals, including Avenue Q, Jersey Boys, The Lion King, South Pacific, In The Heights, On The Town, Wicked, and Godspell. Ellen's currently has multiple members of their singing waitstaff in and out of Broadway shows, national tours, and Off-Broadway productions. Alex Grayson has been in and out of the diner for the past two years leaving his serving job to perform in Into the Woods, Parade, and currently is playing Dallas Winston in The Outsiders on Broadway. Ellen’s has several servers that go in and out of productions such as Zak Resnick, Gabrielle Foster, Xavier McKinnon, Matt DeAngelis, Christine Dwyer, and Tiffany Mann. Recently, two employees made their Broadway debut; Nyseli Vega as Millie / Understudy for Jersey in Hell’s Kitchen, and Natalie Ortega as Nessa Rose in Wicked.
