= From New Orleans to Chicago =

Studio album by Champion Jack Dupree
- Released: 1966
- Studio: Decca
- Genre: Blues
- Label: Decca
- Producer: Mike Vernon

Champion Jack Dupree chronology
| Champion Jack Dupree of New Orleans (1965) | From New Orleans to Chicago (1966) | Champion Jack Dupree and His Blues Band (1967) |

From New Orleans to Chicago is an album by the American musician Champion Jack Dupree, released in 1966. It was released in the United States in 1970, reprocessed from mono to stereo. The album was rereleased in 1987 as Won't Be a Fool No More, with two additional tracks, "24 Hours" and "Calcutta Blues".

== Production ==
Recorded at Decca Studios in London, the album was produced by Mike Vernon. Dupree was backed by Tony McPhee and Eric Clapton on guitar, John Mayall on harmonica, Bill Shortt on washboard, Keef Hartley on drums, and Malcolm Pool on bass; unlike many American blues musicians, Dupree thought that his British counterparts were adept at finding the feeling of the blues. "Won't Be Fooled No More" is a cover of the Big Maceo Merriweather song. "T.V. Mama" is a version of the Big Joe Turner song. "(Going Down To) Big Leg Emma's" is performed as a spoken blues.

== Critical reception ==
Professional ratings
Review scores
| Source | Rating |
|---|---|
| AllMusic | 3/5 stars |
| The Encyclopedia of Popular Music | 3/5 stars |
| Howard Publications | 4/5 stars |
| The Penguin Guide to Blues Recordings | 3/4 stars |

The Sarasota Herald-Tribune called Dupree "one of the gutsiest blues singers of all time." Howard Publications said that the album retains "the inimitable, earthy, engaging style of playing which marks the man." The Daily Telegraph stated that "Dupree's rolling piano and suddenly clamant voice have that indispensable timing of all good blues singers."

The Troy Record opined that Dupree's piano "can be like velvet but whose voice has a hardness that gives his blues a special note of honesty". The Plain Dealer preferred Dupree's skill on the piano to his voice. The Calgary Herald concluded that From New Orleans to Chicago "just might become a classic of its type."

== Track listing ==
Side 1

1. "Third Degree"
2. "T.V. Mama"
3. "He Knows the Rules"
4. "Ain't It a Shame"
5. "Ooh-La-La"
6. "(Going Down To) Big Leg Emma's"
7. "Won't Be Fooled No More"

Side 2

1. "Take It Slow and Easy"
2. "She's All in My Life"
3. "Poor Poor Me"
4. "Pigfoot and a Bottle of Beer"
5. "Down the Valley"
6. "Too Early in the Morning"
7. "Shim-Sham-Shimmy"
