= Junco Partner =

1980 song performed by The Clash

"Junco Partner", also known as "Junco Partner (Worthless Man)", is a blues song first recorded by American rhythm and blues singer James Wayne in 1951. It has been recorded and revised by many other artists over several decades, including Louis Jordan, Michael Bloomfield, Dr. John, Professor Longhair, James Booker, Hugh Laurie, and the Clash. It has been covered in various genres of music including blues, folk, rock, reggae, and dub.

== Early recordings ==
Singer James Wayne made the first recording of "Junco Partner" in 1951, for Bob Shad's record label "Sittin' in with...". The song is credited to Shad and "Robert Ellen" (a pseudonym Shad used on some recordings), though it was directly inspired by the Willie Hall song "Junker's Blues". According to musician Mac Rebennack ("Dr. John"), James Waynes' recording made the song popular, although it was already widely known among musicians in New Orleans and elsewhere as "the anthem of the dopers, the whores, the pimps, the cons. It was a song they sang in Angola, the state prison farm, and the rhythm was even known as the 'jailbird beat'." In 1952, several artists covered the song, including Richard Hayes with the Eddie Sauter Orchestra (whose version got to No. 15 on Billboard's Pop Music charts), and Louis Jordan & His Tympany Five for Decca.

Fully credited to himself, Chuck Berry's 1961 "The Man and the Donkey" is based on the "Junco Partner" melody with a story based on a traditional West African tale heard on other songs such as Willie Dixon's Signifying Monkey (1947) or Oscar Brown, Jr.'s Signifying Monkey (1960).

== Later versions ==
Roland Stone, an R&B singer from New Orleans, recorded two versions with rewritten lyrics, the first in 1959 as "Preacher's Daughter", and the second in 1961 as "Down the Road". The Holy Modal Rounders recorded the song as "Junko Partner" in 1965.

The 1970s produced several widely known covers. In 1972, Dr. John covered the song for his Dr. John's Gumbo album. In 1976, Professor Longhair covered it for his Rock 'n' Roll Gumbo album, and James Booker did the same for his homonymous album, "Junco Partner".

Bob Dylan's 1986 album Knocked Out Loaded took its title from a "Junco Partner" lyric. The Hindu Love Gods, with Warren Zevon as lead singer and three members of R.E.M., released their recording of this song on their self-titled 1990 album, under the title "Junko Pardner".

Carlos del Junco covered the song for his Big Boy album, released in 1999. In 2002, New Orleans' Dirty Dozen Brass Band covered the song on their album Medicated Magic. John Scofield included the song in his 2022 solo album.

== The Clash version ==
"Junco Partner"

Song by the Clash

from the album Sandinista!
- Released: 12 December 1980
- Genre: Reggae
- Length: 4:53
- Label: CBS; Epic
- Songwriter: Bob Shad aka Robert Ellen
- Producers: Mikey Dread; The Clash

It was Richard Hayes' version that caught the ear of Joe Strummer, who recorded it with the London-based band the 101'ers. He later recorded it again, this time in Kingston, Jamaica, with the Clash for their hit triple album Sandinista!, released in 1980, which included two versions: a reggae version, "Junco Partner", and a dub version, "Version Pardner".

== See also ==
- Junker Blues
