= Blues from the Gutter =

Studio album by Champion Jack Dupree
- Released: April 1959
- Recorded: February 4, 1958
- Genre: Blues
- Length: 37:17
- Label: Atco
- Producer: Jerry Wexler

Champion Jack Dupree chronology
Blues from the Gutter (1959)	Champion of the Blues (1961)

Professional ratings
Review scores
Source	Rating
AllMusic	5/5 stars
The Penguin Guide to Blues Recordings	+ “Crown”

Blues from the Gutter is the first album by blues musician Champion Jack Dupree. In addition to a four-star rating, The Penguin Guide to Blues Recordings awarded the album a “crown”, indicating that the authors considered it an exceptional and essential recording.

== Track listing ==
All tracks composed by Champion Jack Dupree; except where indicated

1. "Strollin'" – 4:31
2. "T.B. Blues" – 3:38
3. "Can't Kick the Habit" – 3:39
4. "Evil Woman" – 4:17
5. "Nasty Boogie" – 3:06
6. "Junker's Blues" – 3:09
7. "Bad Blood" – 3:56
8. "Goin' Down Slow" (James Burke Oden) – 4:01
9. "Frankie and Johnny" (Traditional) – 3:03
10. "Stack-O-Lee" (Traditional) – 3:57

Note: the version of "Strollin'" on the CD reissue is a different take to the one on the vinyl album.

== Personnel ==
=== Performance ===
- Champion Jack Dupree – vocals, piano
- Ennis Lowery (a.k.a. Larry Dale) – guitar
- Wendell Marshall – double bass
- Willie Jones – drums
- Pete Brown – alto saxophone

=== Technical ===
- Tom Dowd – recording engineer
- Marvin Israel – cover design
- Lee Friedlander – photography
