= Retina UK =

UK sight loss charity

Retina UK is a charity based in Buckingham, England, that works for people affected by inherited sight loss. This includes conditions such as retinitis pigmentosa (RP), Usher syndrome, Stargardt disease and Leber congenital amaurosis.

The organisation funds medical research, as reviewed by an independent Medical Advisory Board (MAB), consisting of specialist scientists and researchers. The group says that they have provided more than £16 million funding to medical research since they were founded in 1976.

They also work to provide information and support for those living with inherited retinal conditions around the United Kingdom, as well as friends, family and the professionals who support them.

== History ==
Retina UK is a charitable incorporated organisation (CIO). The charity was originally registered as the British Retinitis Pigmentosa Society, formed in 1976, and subsequently known as RP Fighting Blindness until June 2018. The charity's constitution was registered on 18 September 2013 as charity number 1153851 and amended on 19 June 2018.

== Governance ==
The Board of Trustees comprises a minimum of three and a maximum of twelve members. The Board normally meets quarterly and is quorate for making decisions with a minimum of three fifths of Trustees present.
