= Larry Dale =

American blues singer and guitarist

Larry Dale (born Ennis L. Lowery, January 7, 1923 – May 19, 2010) was an American blues singer, guitarist and session musician.

== Life and career ==
He was born in Wharton, Texas, United States. During the early 1950s he took initial inspiration on guitar playing from B.B. King, making his first recordings as a sideman for Paul Williams and his Orchestra (on Jax Records), and for Big Red McHouston & His Orchestra. Taking the name Larry Dale, he recorded for the RCA subsidiary Groove Records with a band that included Mickey Baker and pianist Champion Jack Dupree. He also wrote songs using the name Larry Dale Matthews.

Dale performed on the New York club circuit with the pianist Bob Gaddy in the 1950s. He was also a frequent session guitarist in the New York studios, playing on all four of Dupree's 1956–58 sessions for RCA's Groove and Vik subsidiaries, and on the best known Dupree LP, 1958's Blues from the Gutter, for Atlantic. Dale made most of his best sides as a leader when the decade turned from the 1950s to the 1960s. For Glover Records he recorded the party blues "Let the Doorbell Ring" and "Big Muddy" in 1960, then revived Stick McGhee's "Drinkin' Wine-Spo-Dee-O-Dee" in 1962 on Atlantic.

He died in New York in May 2010, at the age of 87.
