= Champion Jack Dupree =

American blues and boogie-woogie pianist and singer (1909/10–1992)

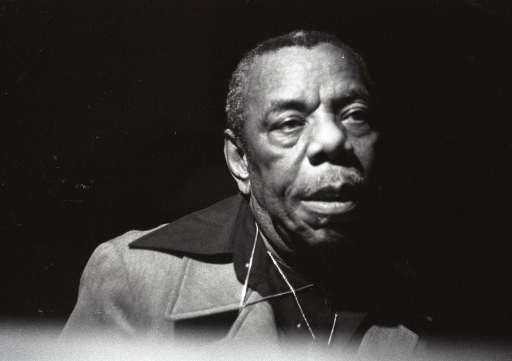

Background information
- Also known as: Harelip Jack Dupree
- Born: William Thomas Dupree; July 4, 1910; New Orleans, Louisiana, U.S.
- Died: January 21, 1992 (aged 81) Hanover, Germany
- Genres: Blues; boogie-woogie
- Occupation: Musician
- Instruments: Piano; vocals
- Years active: 1931–1991
- Labels: Atlantic; OKeh; Blue Horizon; Groove
- Military career
- Allegiance: United States
- Branch: United States Navy
- Conflicts: World War II
- Relatives: Tyler Dupree (grandson)

William Thomas "Champion Jack" Dupree (July 23, 1909 or July 4, 1910 – January 21, 1992) was an American blues and boogie-woogie pianist and singer. His nickname was derived from his early career as a boxer.

== Biography ==
Dupree was a New Orleans blues and boogie-woogie pianist, a barrelhouse "professor". His father was from the Belgian Congo and his mother was part African American and Cherokee. His birth date has been given as July 4, July 10, and July 23, 1908, 1909, or 1910; the researchers Bob Eagle and Eric LeBlanc give July 4, 1910.

He was orphaned at the age of eight and sent to the Colored Waifs' Home in New Orleans, an institution for orphaned or delinquent boys (about six years previously, Louis Armstrong had also been sent to the Home, after being arrested as a "dangerous and suspicious character"). Dupree taught himself to play the piano there and later apprenticed with Tuts Washington and Willie Hall, whom he called his father and from whom he learned "Junker's Blues". He was also a "spy boy" for the Yellow Pocahontas tribe of the Mardi Gras Indians. He soon began playing in barrelhouses and other drinking establishments.

He began a life of travelling, living in Chicago, where he worked with Georgia Tom, and in Indianapolis, Indiana, where he met Scrapper Blackwell and Leroy Carr. He also worked as a cook. In Detroit, after Joe Louis encouraged him to become a boxer, he fought 107 bouts, winning Golden Gloves and other championships and picking up the nickname Champion Jack, which he used the rest of his life.

He returned to Chicago at the age of 30 and joined a circle of recording artists, including Big Bill Broonzy and Tampa Red, who introduced him to the record producer Lester Melrose. Many of Dupree's songs were later credited to Melrose as composer, and Melrose claimed publishing rights to them.

Dupree's career was interrupted by military service in World War II. He was a cook in the United States Navy and was held by the Japanese for two years as a prisoner of war. Following Franklin D. Roosevelt's death in office, Dupree composed the "F.D.R. Blues".

After the war, his biggest commercial success was "Walkin' the Blues", which he recorded as a duet with Teddy McRae. This led to several national tours and eventually a European tour. In 1959, he played an unofficial (and unpaid) duo gig with Alexis Korner at the London School of Economics.

Dupree moved to Europe in 1960, settling first in Switzerland and then Denmark, England, Sweden and, finally, Germany. In Switzerland he met local guitarist Chris Lange at the Africana Club in Zurich. Lange became Dupree’s regular guitarist, and played a lot with him on several albums for the ‘Folkways’ and ‘Storyville’ labels and accompanied him also on his many other gigs in Europe between 1961 and 1965. On June 17, 1971, he played at the Montreux Jazz Festival, in the Casino Kursaal, with King Curtis, backed by Cornell Dupree on guitar, Jerry Jemmott on bass and Oliver Jackson on drums. The recording of the concert was released in 1973 as the album King Curtis & Champion Jack Dupree: Blues at Montreux on the Atlantic label.

In the mid-1970s, Dupree lived at Ovenden in Halifax, England, after marrying a local woman, Shirley Ann Harrison, whom he had met in London. A piano he used was later discovered at Calderdale College in Halifax.

In 1976, he divorced Shirley and moved to Copenhagen, where he lived in the anarchist-occupied Freetown Christiania, where he met guitarist Kenn Lending. Dupree and Lending would form a partnership that lasted until Dupree's death in 1992. This period of his life was the subject of the 1975 film Barrelhouse Blues - Feelings and Situations by the artists Laurie Grundt and Eva Acking which includes several filmed performances, including one where Dupree plays drum set. Dupree later moved to Hanover, Germany. He continued to record in Europe with Kenn Lending, Louisiana Red and Axel Zwingenberger and made many live appearances. He also worked again as a cook, specializing in New Orleans cuisine. In 1990 Dupree returned to the United States to perform at the New Orleans Jazz & Heritage Festival. The event was marked with the recording of the album Back Home in New Orleans. He died of cancer on January 21, 1992, in Hanover.

== Musical style and output ==
Dupree's playing was almost all straight blues and boogie-woogie. He was not a sophisticated musician or singer, but he had a wry and clever way with words: "Mama, move your false teeth, papa wanna scratch your gums". He sometimes sang as if he had a cleft palate and even recorded under the name Harelip Jack Dupree. This was an artistic conceit, as he had clear articulation, particularly for a blues singer.

Many of his songs were about jail, drinking and drug addiction, although he himself was a light drinker and did not use other drugs. His "Junker's Blues" was transmuted by Fats Domino into "The Fat Man", Domino's first hit record. Some of Dupree's songs had gloomy topics, such as "TB Blues" and "Angola Blues" (about Louisiana State Penitentiary, the infamous Louisiana prison farm), but he also sang about cheerful subjects, as in "Dupree Shake Dance": "Come on, mama, on your hands and knees, do that shake dance as you please". He was a noted raconteur and transformed many of his stories into songs, such as "Big Leg Emma's", a rhymed tale of a police raid on a barrelhouse.

The lyrics of Jerry Lee Lewis's version of "Whole Lotta Shakin' Goin' On"—"You can shake it one time for me!"—echo Dupree's song "Shake Baby Shake".

On his best-known album, Blues from the Gutter, released by Atlantic Records in 1958, he was accompanied on guitar by Larry Dale.

In later years Dupree recorded with John Mayall, Mick Taylor, Eric Clapton and The Band.

Although best known as a singer and pianist in the New Orleans style, Dupree occasionally pursued more musically adventurous projects, including Dupree 'N' McPhee: The 1967 Blue Horizon Session, a collaboration with the English guitarist Tony McPhee, recorded for the Blue Horizon label.

Since his death, Dupree has undergone a revival of interest on the British vintage dance scene. His recording of "Shakin' Mother for You" now features on the playlist of most DJ's on the UK Lindy Hop scene and it has become the 'de facto' standard track for the 'Cardiff Stroll'.

== Discography ==
=== Studio albums ===
- Blues from the Gutter (Atlantic, 1958)
- Champion Jack's Natural & Soulful Blues (Atlantic, 1959)
- Champion of the Blues (Atlantic, 1961)
- The Women Blues of Champion Jack Dupree (Folkways, 1961)
- Trouble, Trouble (Storyville, 1962)
- The Best of the Blues (Storyville, 1963)
- Champion Jack Dupree Of New Orleans (Storyville, 1965)
- From New Orleans to Chicago (Decca, 1966)
- When You Feel the Feeling You Was Feeling (Blue Horizon, 1968) with Paul Kossoff, guitar; Duster Bennett, harmonica; Simon Kirke, drums
- Scoobydoobydoo (Blue Horizon, 1969, UK), also released as Blues Masters, Vol. 10 (Blue Horizon, 1972)
- The Heart of the Blues Is Sound (BYG, 1969)
- The Incredible Champion Jack Dupree (Sonet, 1970), 12 tracks recorded in Copenhagen in 1960-63.
- The Hamburg Session (Happy Bird, 1974)
- Champion Jack Dupree "1977" (Isadora, 1977), also released as Hamhark & Limer Beans
- Back Home in New Orleans (Bullseye Blues, 1990)
- Forever and Ever (Bullseye Blues, 1991)
- One Last Time (Bullseye Blues, 1993)

=== Live albums ===
- Champion Jack Dupree (Festival, 1971)
- Alive, "Live" and Well (Chrischaa, 1976)
- The Blues Jubilee Album (Pinorrekk, 1984)
- Live at Burnley (JSP, 1989)
- Jivin' with Jack: Live in Manchester, May 1966 (Jasmine, 2002)
- Bad Luck Blues: Live with Freeway 75 (Bad Luck Blues, 2003)

=== Collaborations ===
- Champion Jack Dupree And His Blues Band featuring Mickey Baker (Decca, 1967)
- Tricks, with Mickey Baker (Vogue, 1968), also released as Anthologie du Blues, Vol. 1 (Disques Vogue, 1968, France)
- I'm Happy to Be Free, with Mickey Baker and Hal Singer (Vogue, 1971)
- Blues at Montreux, with King Curtis (Atlantic, 1973)
- Freedom, with the Monty Sunshine band (Pinorrekk, 1980)
- Real Combination, with Henry Ojutkangas (Dig It, 1980)
- I Had That Dream, with Kenn Lending (Pinorrekk, 1982)
- Get You An Ol' Man, with Brenda Bell and Louisiana Red (Paris, 1984)
- Rockin' The Boogie, with Kenn Lending (Blue Moon, 1988)
- Sings Blues Classics, with Axel Zwingenberger (Vagabond, 1990)
- Dupree 'n' McPhee: The 1967 Blue Horizon Session, Champion Jack Dupree and TS McPhee (Ace, 2005)
