= Roy Orbison's Sun recordings =

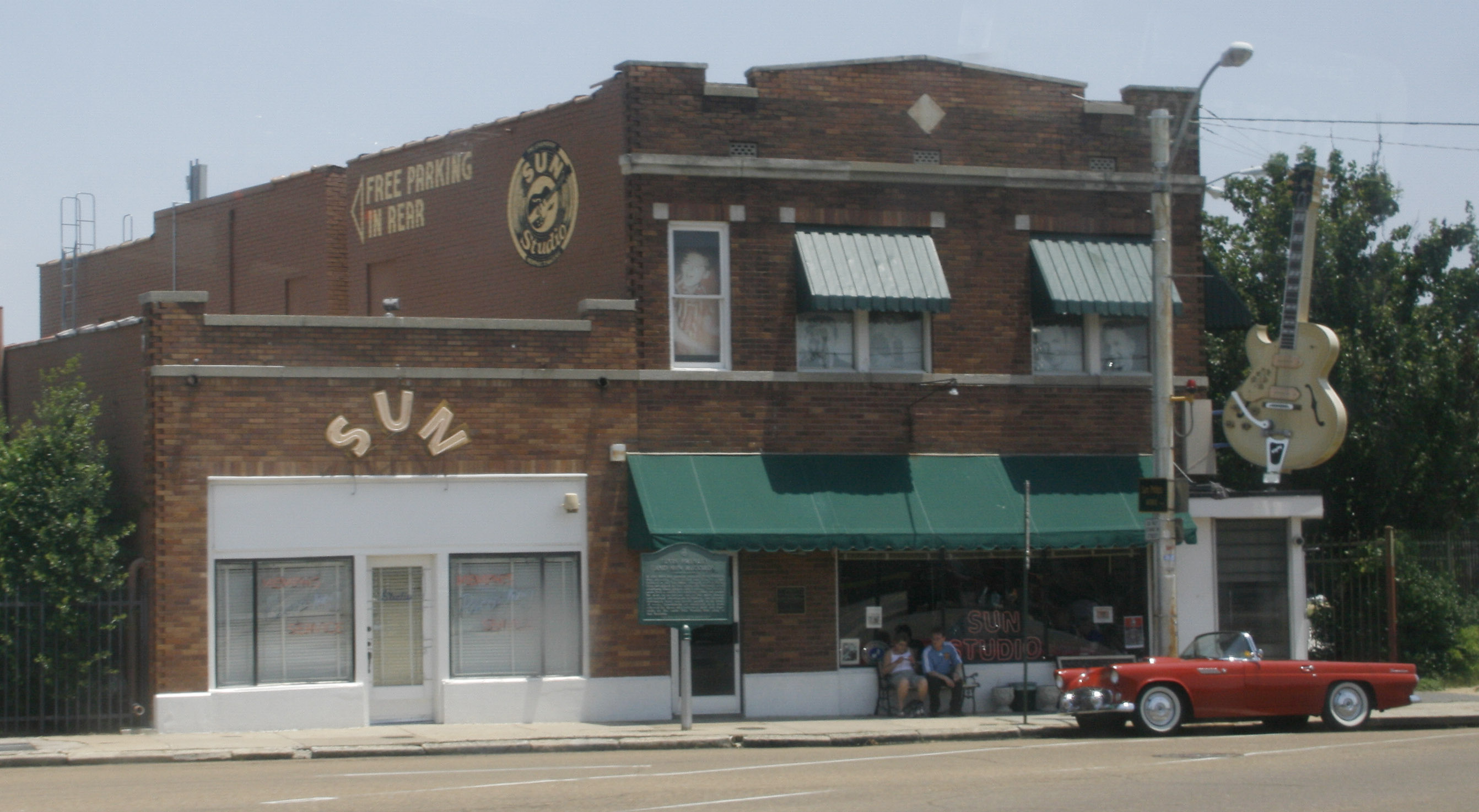
- Parent company: Sun Entertainment Corp.
- Founded: 1952
- Founder: Sam Phillips
- Genre: Various, rockabilly, country music, rock and roll, blues
- Location: 706 Union Ave. Memphis, Tennessee 38103 (current) 3106 Belmont Blvd. Nashville, Tennessee 37212
- Official website: www.sunrecords.com

Roy Orbison's Sun recordings were made by Orbison at Sun Studio (The Memphis Recording Service) with producer Sam Phillips. Sun Records was established in 1952 in Memphis, Tennessee, and during an eight-year period Phillips recorded such artists as Roy Orbison, B.B. King, Howlin' Wolf, Ike Turner, Rufus Thomas, Elvis Presley, Johnny Cash, Jerry Lee Lewis, Carl Perkins, Harold Jenkins, and Charlie Rich. The musicians signed at Sun Records made music that laid the foundation of rock and roll in the 20th century.

== History ==
Roy Kelton Orbison was born in Vernon, Texas, on April 23, 1936, and he grew up in Wink, Texas. His parents Orbie Lee and Nadine, gave him a guitar for his sixth birthday and taught him the chords to "You Are My Sunshine". Roy Orbison grew up around country music and later stated it was a great influence to him. "I grew up with country music in Texas. The first singer I heard on the radio who really slayed me was Lefty Frizzell. He had this technique which involved sliding syllables together that really blew me away."

By the time Orbison was eight years old, he was performing on local radio shows, and at thirteen years old he formed the band The Wink Westerners. The Wink Westerners obtained local notoriety and performed mainly country and pop songs. He began singing and playing guitar professionally in his teens with the band the Wink Westerners. The Wink Westerners had a weekly television show for them on KMID-TV. Roy Orbison attended North Texas University after high school, and it was there where he discovered rock and roll and began to write more pop oriented songs. Orbison stayed at North Texas for only a year stating he felt like he was in the "wrong place at the wrong time." He left and moved to Odessa, Texas where he formed The Teen Kings. The Teen Kings consisted of Roy Orbison, James Morrow, Jack Kennelley, Billy Pat Ellis, and Johnny "Peanuts" Wilson.

The Teen Kings got a job on a local television show and they recorded "Ooby Dooby" (written by two fellow North Texas State students Dick Penner and Wade Moore) for a local label. In 1956, singer/songwriter Johnny Cash appeared on the show and on his advice Orbison and the Teen Kings signed with Sun Records in Memphis. Shortly after signing a new version of "Ooby Dooby" was recorded and became a hit in 1956. "Ooby Dooby" did well nationwide, reaching no. 59 on the Billboards Hot 100 and sold roughly 200,000 copies. According to The Authorized Roy Orbison, the follow-up single was "Rockhouse" b/w "You're My Baby"; shortly after this release the Teen Kings disbanded, and Orbison remained under contract to Sun as a solo artist. Orbison continued recording using the Sun house musicians. Not unlike several other artists at Sun, Roy Orbison was unhappy with the direction Sam Phillips was taking. Orbison noted that he wasn't quite comfortable with rockabilly but later stated he enjoyed the freedom in the studio that came with being a Sun artist. Sun's musical director Bill Justice gave Orbison the song "Chicken Hearted." Released in December 1957, it was Orbison's last shot at remaining a contracted artist for Sun.

Shortly after the failure of "Chicken Hearted", Orbison moved back to Texas with his first wife, Claudette Frady. Sam Phillips later stated having regret in not promoting Orbison more than he did. Orbison began to question rather or not he still wanted to be a performer and began to focus more on writing. As a writer, Orbison scored a Hot 100 hit for Warren Smith with "So Long I'm Gone" and he did even better when Jerry Lee Lewis recorded a new version of "Go!, Go!, Go!", renaming the track "Down The Line." The greatest writing success Orbison had was due to The Everly Brothers recording the song "Claudette". The success of "Claudette" gave Orbison enough money to buy himself out of his contract at Sun and he signed over all of his copyrights in exception to "Claudette". Roy Orbison played lead guitar in all of his Sun Records recordings, creating a breakthrough sound which became such a big part of rockabilly music. According to The Authorized Roy Orbison, Orbison's first two Sun singles were released in the UK on an extended play called Hillbilly Rock (London Records RES 1089) in 1957.

Orbison affiliated himself with the Everlys' music publisher, Acuff-Rose. Wesley Rose got Orbison a one-year contract with RCA, an affiliation that spawned two mediocre singles. During the last RCA session, Orbison had a conversation with bassist Bob Moore, who was buying himself a stake in Monument Records. Moore called owner Fred Foster, and said, "You know what I heard today? RCA's letting Roy Orbison go." Fred Foster signed Roy Orbison. Orbison, still in Texas began writing with Joe Melson, who led a group in Midland called the Cavaliers. Together they wrote the hit "Uptown," which sold better than any single since "Ooby Dooby". Looking for a follow-up, Melson showed Orbison a piece of a song he had been working on called "Only the Lonely". This song was the "first song that truly probed the frightening potential of Orbison's voice." In the early sixties Orbison reached his first peak period from 1961 to 1964. Despite the lack of commercial success, Orbison looked back at his time at Sun Records as an important and historical part of his career.

Into the seventies and early eighties, artists such as Linda Ronstadt, Van Halen, Don McLean, had hits with Orbison's songs. In 1980, Roy Orbison released "That Lovin' You Feelin' Again" with Emmylou Harris, winning the artists a grammy.

After Roy's death in 1988, he had two simultaneous posthumously-charting Top 5 albums with Mystery Girl and The Traveling Wilburys. Mystery Girl eventually went platinum and reached no. 5 on the US Billboard 200 and no. 2 on the UK Albums Chart.

== Recordings ==
Orbison recorded at Sun Records from 1956-1958.

=== "Ooby Dooby" (2:11) ===
Written by Wade Moore and Dick Penner
Produced by Sam Phillips
Recorded Spring 1956; Memphis
Released as Sun Single #242
Peak Chart Position no. 59 pop
Roy Orbison-vocals, guitar; Johnny Wilson-guitar; James Marrow-electric mandolin; Jack Kennelley-bass; Billy Pat Ellis-drums

=== "Go Go Go (Down the Line)" (2:07) ===
Written by Roy Orbison
Produced by Sam Phillips
Recorded Spring 1956; Memphis
Released as B-Side of Sun Single #242
Roy Orbison-vocals, guitar; Johnny Wilson-guitar; James Marrow-electric mandolin; Jack Kennelley-bass; Billy Pat Ellis-drums

=== "Rockhouse" (2:03) ===
Written by Conway Twitty and Roy Orbison
Produced by Sam Phillips
Recorded Summer 1956; Memphis
Released as Sun Single #251

=== "You're My Baby" (2:05) ===
Written by Johnny Cash
Produced by Sam Phillips
Recorded Summer 1956; Memphis
Released as B-Side of Sun Single #251
Roy Orbison-vocals, guitar; Johnny Wilson-guitar; James Marrow-electric mandolin, Jack Kennelley-bass; Billy Pat Ellis-drums

=== "Sweet and Easy to Love" (2:10) ===
Written by Roy Orbison
Recorded 1957; Memphis
Released as Sun Single #265
Roy Orbison-vocals, guitar; Roland James-guitar; J.M. Van Eaton-drums; The Roses-vocal chords

=== "Devil Doll" (2:09) ===
Written by Roy Orbison
Recorded 1957; Memphis
Released as Sun Single #265

=== "Chicken Hearted" (2:17) ===
Written by Bill Justis Released as Sun Single #284

=== "I Like Love" (2:28) ===
Written by Jack Clement
Released as Sun Single #284

=== "Ooby Dooby" (alt) ===
Written by Wade Moore and Dick Penner
Produced by Sam Phillips
Recorded Spring 1956; Memphis
Released as Sun Single #242
Peak Chart Position no. 59 pop
Roy Orbison-vocals, guitar; Johnny Wilson-guitar; James Marrow-electric mandolin; Jack Kennelley-bass; Billy Pat Ellis-drums

=== "Tryin' to Get to You" (2:45) ===
Written by C. Singleton and Rose Marie McCoy
Recorded Spring 1956; Memphis
Roy Orbison-vocals, guitar; Johnny Wilson-guitar; James Marrow-electric mandolin; Jack Kennelley-bass; Billy Pat Ellis-drums

=== "Cat Called Domino" (2:07) ===
Written by Roy Orbison and Norman Petty
Produced by Sam Phillips
Recorded 1957; Memphis
Roy Orbison-vocals, guitar; additional unidentified personnel

=== "It's Too Late" (1:58) ===
Produced by Sam Phillips
Recorded 1957; Memphis
Roy Orbison-vocals, guitar; additional unidentified personnel

=== "You're Gonna Cry" (2:05) ===
Written by Roy Orbison
Recorded 1957; Memphis
Roy Orbison-vocals, guitar; additional unidentified personnel

=== "This Kind Of Love" (2:07) ===
Written by Roy Orbison
Recorded 1957; Memphis
Roy Orbison-vocals, guitar; additional unidentified personnel

=== "Mean Little Mama" (1:55) ===
Written by Roy Orbison
Produced by Jack Clement and Bill Justis
Recorded October 1957; Memphis
Roy Orbison-vocals, guitar; Roland James-guitar; Jimmy Smith; piano; Stan Kesler or dis Manker-bass; Otis Jet-Drums

=== "Problem Child" (2:19) ===
Written by Roy Orbison
Produced by Jack Clement and Bill Justis
Recorded October 1957; Memphis
Roy Orbison-vocals, guitar; Roland James-guitar; Jimmy Smith; piano; Stan Kesler or dis Manker-bass; Otis Jet-Drums

=== "Fools' Hall of Fame" (2:00) ===
Written by Danny Wolfe
Recorded 1957; Memphis

=== "The Cause of It All" (2:25) ===
Written by Roy Orbison 1956

=== "A True Love Goodbye" (2:20) ===
Written by Roy Orbison and Norman Petty
Recorded 1957; Memphis

=== "Love Struck" (1:19) ===
Written by Roy Orbison and Johnny Wilson
Recorded January 1958; Memphis

=== "You Tell Me" (1:31) ===
Written by Sam Phillips
Recorded 1958; Memphis
Roy Orbison-vocals, guitar

=== "I Give Up" (2:12) ===
Written by Roy Orbison
Recorded January 1958; Memphis

=== "One More Time" (1:15) ===
(demo recording)
Recorded January 1958; Memphis
Roy Orbison-vocals, guitar

=== "Claudette" (2:10) ===
(demo recording)
Written by Roy Orbison
Recorded 1958; Memphis

== Albums ==
=== Roy Orbison at the Rock House (20:34) ===
At the Rock House was Roy Orbison's second album, and was released in 1961 after Orbison had signed with Monument Records. Sam Phillips released a collection of Orbison's recordings from 1956-1958, in an attempt to capitalize on Orbison's newly found success at another label.

For this release, all tracks except "Devil Doll" have been overdubbed with background vocals and/or additional instruments.

Tracks

1. "This Kind of Love"
2. "Devil Doll"
3. "You're My Baby" (Johnny Cash)
4. "Rock House" (Phillips, Harold Jenkins)
5. "You're Gonna Cry"
6. "I Never Knew"
7. "Sweet and Easy to Love"
8. "Mean Little Mama"
9. "Ooby Dooby" (Wade Moore, Dick Penner)
10. "Problem Child" (Roy Orbison)

== Bibliography ==
- Escott, Colin (1992). Good Rockin' Tonight: Sun Records and the Birth of Rock 'n' Roll. New York, N.Y.: St.Martin's Press. ISBN 0-312-08199-5.
- Pareles, Jon & Romanowski, Patricia (1983). The Rolling Stone Encyclopedia of Rock & Roll (3rd ed.). New York, NY: Rolling Stone Press/Summit Books. ISBN 0-7432-0120-5.
- Orbison, Roy Jr.; Orbison, Wesley; Orbison, Alex; Slate, Jeff (2017). The Authorized Roy Orbison. New York: Center Street. ISBN 978-1-478-97654-7. OCLC 1017566749.
- Jeff, Slate (2017). The Authorized Roy Orbison. New York, NY: Center Street. ISBN 978-1-478-97654-7. OCLC 1017566749.
- Whitburn, Joel (1988). Top 1000 singles 1955-1987. Milwaukee, WI: Billboard Publications. ISBN 0-88188-963-6.
- Pareles, Jon (December 8, 1988). "Roy Orbison, 52, a Singer Famed For Plaintive Pop Anthems, Dies". New York Times.
- Kemp, Mark. "Roy Orbison Bio". Rolling Stone. Archived from the original on March 31, 2012.
- Gates, David (August 18, 1997). "Good Rockin'". Newsweek. pp. 1–4.
- Pond, Steve (January 26, 1989). "Roy Orbison's Triumphs and Tragedies". Rolling Stone.
