= James Wayne (R&B musician) =

American R&B singer, songwriter and musician (1920/24–1978)

- Also known as: James Waynes; Wee Willie Wayne
- Born: James Douglas Wayne; March 3, 1920 (possibly); Houston, Texas, U.S.
- Died: March 31, 1978 (aged 58) Los Angeles, California, U.S.
- Occupations: Singer, songwriter
- Years active: c. 1950 – early 1960s
- Labels: Sittin' In With, Imperial, Aladdin, Peacock, Angletone

James Douglas Wayne (March 3, 1920 or April 17, 1924 – March 31, 1978), who recorded in the 1950s and early 1960s as James Waynes, James Wayne, and Wee Willie Wayne, was an American rhythm and blues singer, songwriter and musician. He recorded "a fine blend of Texas blues and New Orleans R&B". He had a no.2 hit on the Billboard R&B chart in 1951 with the song "Tend To Your Business", and that year also recorded one of the earliest versions of the widely performed song "Junco Partner".

== Biography ==
Details of his life are obscure. According to his own account, he was born in Houston, Texas, in 1920, although some sources give his birthplace as Jefferson County, Texas with a date of birth in 1924, and others state it as New Orleans.

He claimed to have undertaken training as a commando, and spent time in jail around 1950 for burglary, before becoming a musician. He sang, played guitar, and reportedly also played drums. He is believed to have first recorded in Houston, for the Sittin' In With record label started by Bob Shad. His recording of "Tend To Your Business" became a hit in 1951, and stayed on the R&B chart for 14 weeks. He followed it up with "Junco Partner (Worthless Man)" in 1952, recorded by Shad in Atlanta, Georgia. According to musician Mac Rebennack (Dr. John), Wayne's version made the song popular, although it was already widely known among musicians in New Orleans and elsewhere, as: "the anthem of the dopers, the whores, the pimps, the cons. It was a song they sang in Angola, the state prison farm, and the rhythm was even known as the 'jailbird beat'." In all, he recorded five singles for the Sittin' In With label, the first three credited to James Waynes, with a final "s".

Wayne then recorded with Lee Allen and other musicians for Imperial Records in New Orleans, before moving to the Aladdin label in Los Angeles, and then Old Town Records. He returned to Imperial in 1955, when he began to record as Wee Willie Wayne. One of his recordings there was "Travelin' Mood", which became another R&B standard recorded by Dr. John and others; the B-side was "I Remember", another classic recording. He also recorded for the Peacock and Angle Tone labels, before returning again in 1961 to Imperial where he recorded an updated version of "Tend To Your Business", as part of an album, Travelin' Mood, mostly made up of earlier recordings.

He did not record after 1961. In February 1967, he was arrested after setting fire to a motel in South Central Los Angeles following an argument with its manager, and was charged on three felony counts. He was found to have had a history of alcoholism, and to be suffering from paranoid schizophrenia, and was committed to a mental health institution. His claims of having been a successful musician were initially discounted by the authorities. He spent several years in the Atascadero State Mental Hospital in the early 1970s, before being released.

In 1975, he was reportedly living in Los Angeles. According to blues researchers Bob Eagle and Eric LeBlanc, he died in Los Angeles in 1978 and was buried at Santa Fe Springs.

A compilation LP, Travelin' From Texas To New Orleans, was issued by Sundown Records in 1982. A CD compilation of the same title was issued in 2002, and a CD of his 1950-1955 recordings was issued by Jasmine Records in 2019.

== Discography ==
=== Singles ===
- "Gypsy Blues" / "Millionaire Blues" (Sittin' In With 573, 9/50)
- "Tend To Your Business" / "Love Me Blues" (Sittin' In With 588, 3/51)
- "Junco Partner (Worthless Man)" / "Tryin' To Find A Girl" (Sittin' In With 607, 7/51)
- "When Night Falls" / "Home Town Blues" (Imperial 5151, 9/51)
- "I'm Goin' To Tell Your Mother" / "Please Baby, Please" (Sittin' In With 622, 11/51)
- "A Two Faced Man" / "Bad Weather Blues" (Imperial 5160, 12/51)
- "Ageable Woman" / "Vacant Pillow Blues" (Imperial 5166, 1/52)
- "Money Blues" / "Bullcorn" (Sittin' In With 639, ?/52)
- "I'm In Love With You" / "Sweet Little Woman" (Imperial 5258, ?/53)
- "All The Drinks Are Gone" / "My Greatest Love" (Aladdin 3231, scheduled for 3/54 but never released)
- "Lonely Room" / "Crying In Vain" (Aladdin 3234, 4/54)
- "Junco's Return" / "Gotta Good Girl" with Monroe Tucker Orchestra (Million $ 2009, ?/54)
- "I'll Follow You" / "Patricia" (Fábor 2001, ?/54)
- "Travelin' Mood" / "I Remember" as Wee Willie Wayne (Imperial 5355, 6/55)
- "Good News" / "Kinfolks" as Wee Willie Wayne (Imperial 5368, 10/55)
- "Henpecked" / "Crazy 'Bout My Baby" as Larry Evans (Fábor 4008, ?/56)
- "What About Me" / "Junco Returns" as Larry Evans (Fábor 4009, ?/56)
- "It's You" / "Please Be Mine" (Peacock 1672, 3/57)
- "I Remember" / "I'm In Love With You" as Wee Willie Wayne (Imperial 5624, 9/59) reissues
- "The Trust" / "This Little Letter" (Angle Tone 540, 8/60)
- "Hard To Handle" / "Let's Have A Ball" (Imperial 5696, 10/60)
- "Travelin' Mood" / "Sweet Little Woman" (Imperial 5725, 1/61) reissues
- "I Got To Be Careful" / "Woman – I'm Tired" as Wee Willie Wayne (Imperial 5737, 4/61)

=== Albums ===
- Travelin' Mood (Imperial 9144, 1962)
- Travelin' From Texas To New Orleans (Sundown, 1982) compilation
- Junco Partner: The Very Best of James Wayne 1950-1955 (Jasmine JASMCD-3102, 2019) compilation
