= Lisa Levy =

American artist

- Born: 1956 (age 69–70); New York, New York
- Education: BFA, 1978, Syracuse University
- Known for: Contemporary Art, Performance Art, Painting

Lisa Levy (born 1956) is a contemporary artist living and working in Brooklyn, New York. She is a visual artist, a performance artist, and a radio show host.

Levy had a longstanding career as an art director and studied illustration. From this, she developed her text paintings that give encouraging messages to the viewer.

One of Levy's ongoing art performances is as Dr. Lisa, a self-proclaimed psychotherapist. Stemming from this performance, Levy also hosts a radio show called Dr. Lisa Gives a Sh*t on Radio Free Brooklyn. She has also been crowned Miss Subways 2017. One of her most popular performances is The Artist is Humbly Present (2016). She has also worked with numerous celebrity guest clients, such as Amy Schumer and Joe Gordon-Levitt.
