= Roland Stone =

American singer

- Born: Roland LeBlanc; August 12, 1941; New Orleans, Louisiana, U.S.
- Died: December 22, 1999 (aged 58) Metairie, Louisiana, U.S.
- Genres: R&B; pop
- Occupations: Singer, songwriter
- Instruments: Piano, guitar
- Years active: 1959 - 1999
- Labels: Spinett; Ace; White Cliffs; Orleans

Roland Stone (born Roland LeBlanc, August 12, 1941 – December 22, 1999) was an American rhythm and blues and pop singer who performed and recorded in New Orleans between the 1950s and 1990s. Singer Aaron Neville described him as "the singingest white guy I've ever heard".

== Biography ==
He was born in New Orleans, and in his teens played guitar in a Warren Easton High School band, The Jokers. In 1959 he was invited by Mac Rebennack (later known as Dr. John) to join his group, The Skyliners. He won a contract with Ace Records, but made his first recording, a version of the song "Junco Partner" re-worked as "Preacher's Daughter", for the Spinett label, set up by singer Frankie Ford and his manager Joe Caronna. For contractual reasons Caronna changed the singer's name to Stone. At the Ace label, he then recorded "Something Special", which was written and produced by Rebennack, and arranged by Allen Toussaint, and "Just a Moment", which became a regional hit and sold an estimated 100,000 copies. However, later records in the early 1960s, some released on Cosimo Matassa's White Cliffs label, failed to sell.

In 1964, Stone quit the music business. He worked in New Orleans and then Texas – where he performed occasionally under his real name until the late 1970s – before returning to his home city in 1979 to work in his uncle's dry cleaning business. Following an approach from record producer Carlo Ditta, he recorded again with Dr. John in the 1990s, releasing two albums on Orleans Records, Remember Me (1992) and Live on the Creole Queen (1997). He also performed at local clubs and festivals, while working with his brother in a galvanized metal company.

A compilation of his Ace recordings was issued in the UK in 1999. He died at East Jefferson General Hospital in Metairie, Louisiana on December 22, 1999, of complications from a surgery. He was 58.

== Discography ==
- 1961 Just a Moment (Ace)
- 1992 Remember Me (Orleans)
- 1997 Live on the Creole Queen (Orleans)

=== Compilations ===
- 1999 Just a Moment - Something Special from Roland Stone (Westside)
- 2022 Just a Moment of Your Time - New Orleans R&B and Swamp Pop from Roland Stone (Jasmine)
