= Rinky Dink (instrumental) =

Single by Dave "Baby" Cortez

from the album Rinky Dink
- B-side: "Getting Right"
- Released: June 1962
- Genre: Pop
- Length: 2:40
- Label: Chess
- Songwriters: Dave "Baby" Cortez, Paul Winley

Dave "Baby" Cortez singles chronology
"Come on and Stomp" (1961)	"Rinky Dink" (1962)	"Happy Weekend" (1962)

"Rinky Dink" is an instrumental written by Dave "Baby" Cortez and Paul Winley and performed by Cortez. It reached #9 on the U.S. R&B chart and #10 on the U.S. pop chart in 1962. It was featured on his 1962 album Rinky Dink. In Canada the song reached #6.

The song ranked #59 on Billboard magazine's Top 100 singles of 1962.

== Other versions ==
- Booker T. & the M.G.'s released a version of the song on their 1962 album Green Onions.
- Bill Justis released a version of the song on his 1962 album Alley Cat/Green Onions: Bill Justis Plays 12 Big Instrumental Hits.
- Steve Allen released a version of the song on his 1963 album Gravy Waltz and 11 Current Hits!.
- Al Grey released a version of the song on his 1963 album Having a Ball.
- Paul Revere & the Raiders released a version of the song on their 1963 album Paul Revere & the Raiders.
- Sounds Incorporated released a version of the song as the B-side to their 1964 single "Spanish Harlem" for their debut self titled album.
- Willie Mitchell released a version of the song on his 1965 album Hold It!!! Here's Willie Mitchell.
- Roland Alphonso and the Studio 1 Orchestra released a version of the song as a single in 1966 in the UK, but it did not chart.
- The Tornados released a version of the song on their 1997 EP.
- 1964 covers by The Johnny Howard Band (Decca F11925) and Sounds Incorporated (Columbia DB 7321) were aired on Radio Caroline.
