= James J. Kriegsmann =

American photographer (1909–1994)

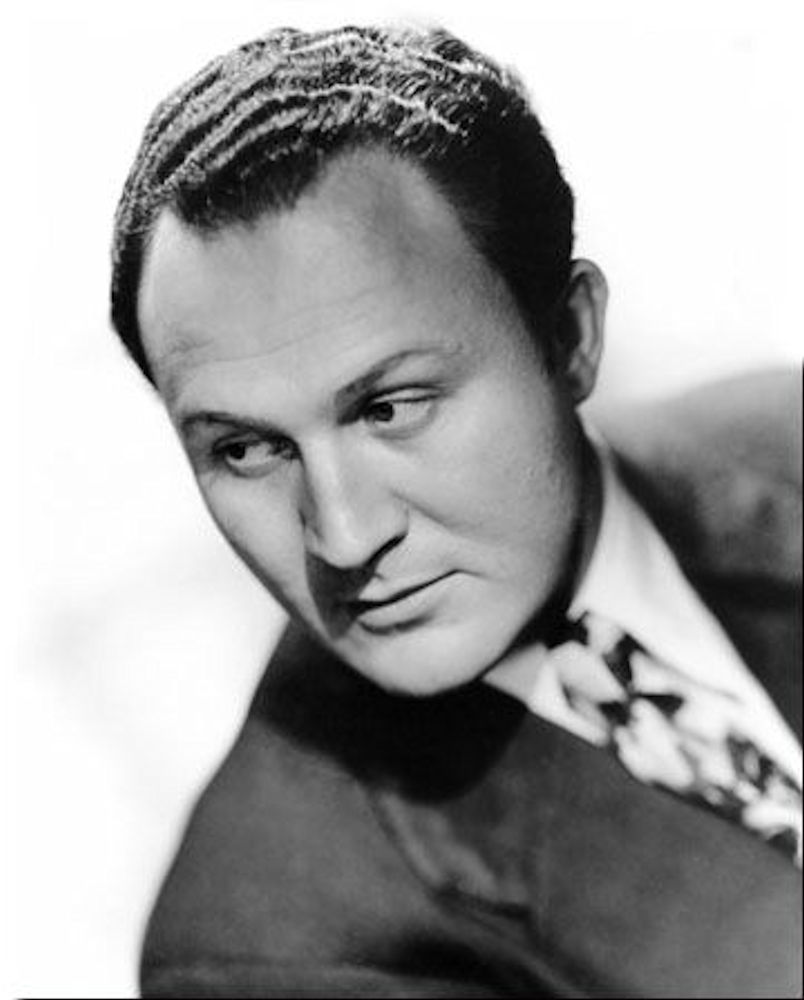
- Self-portrait c. 1950
- Born: January 1, 1909; Vienna, Austria
- Died: April 29, 1994 (aged 85); Forrest Hills, Queens

James J. Kriegsmann (1 January 1909 – 29 April 1994) was an Austrian and American celebrity and theatrical photographer who worked from 1929 to the 1980s.

== Career ==
Born in Bukowina, Czernowitz and later moved to Vienna, Austria, Kriegsmann first took up photography as a hobby, before working as a photography assistant and obtaining his guild license as a master photographer. After arriving in America in 1929, he began working with a photographer who photographed celebrities for Strand Studios, before opening his own studio in 1936. Kriegsmann credited his European background for helping him attract early clients, such as European circus acts who came to him because he spoke their language.

After he was hired as photographer for the Cotton Club, more Broadway performers and celebrities began working with him, such as Frank Sinatra and Jimmy Durante. For the Sinatra photoshoot, Kriegsmann suggested Sinatra wear a bowtie that would become his signature look. Originally shot in 1942, by 1966 over 5 million prints of the photograph had been made.

In 1954, Kriegsmann created an early example of a music video by combining 4,000 still photos into a three minute "photo-show" that illustrated lyrics to his own song The Steps of St. Marie. Outside of photography, Kriegsmann also wrote pop music. His song Too Much In Love To Care was recorded by Steve Gaynor and Vera Lynn.

Through his career, Kriegsmann photographed notable stars such as Bill Robinson, Count Basie, Duke Ellington, Ray Charles, The Supremes, Johnny Carson, Dean Martin, Jerry Lewis, and Benny Goodman. During 1970s, he photographed the Miss Subways campaign, and by the 1980s, Kriegsmann was remembered as a master in the art of celebrity photography.

Kriegsmann was struggling financially in 1988 and sold his photographic archives to Michael Ochs. Ochs had previously included Kriegsmann's work from the 1940s and 50s in his book Rock Archives: A Photographic Journey Through the First Two Decades of Rock & Roll published in 1984.

At 85 years of age, Kriegsmann died at his home in Forrest Hills, Queens, on 29 April 1994. He was survived by his wife Eugenie and three sons: James Jr., Eugene, and Thomas. James Jr. also became a photographer, and attributed his success to the legacy of his father.
