= Norman Maclean (biologist) =

British biologist (born 1932)

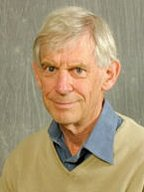
- Born: 1932 (age 93–94); Edinburgh, Scotland
- Education: PhD
- Spouse: Jean Kay Smith: Married 1962
- Children: 2
- Scientific career
- Fields: Biology, genetics
- Institutions: University of Southampton

Norman Maclean is an Emeritus Professor of Genetics at The University of Southampton. Besides genetics he has worked in wildlife conservation and river management. He has been a Director of the Test and Itchen Association, and a panel member of the European Food Safety Authority. He is an elected Fellow of the Royal Society of Biology and the Linnaean Society. Served as the editor of the Molecular and Cell Science section of the Journal of Fish Biology, and also on editorial boards of other journals in the past. Norman was also a Trustee of Marwell Wildlife Park for many years, and served as its Honorary Scientific Advisor.

Maclean has authored, co-authored and edited over a dozen textbooks and reference books in genetics and cell biology. Between 1984 and 1991 he edited an annual review entitled 'Oxford Surveys on Eukaryotic Genes' (published by Oxford University Press) and most recently edited Silent Summer (Cambridge University Press, 2010). His most recent book A Less Green and Pleasant Land (Cambridge University Press, 2015) was published in early 2015.

== Biography ==
Maclean was born in 1932 in Edinburgh, Scotland. He was educated at George Heriot's School before going on to obtain a Scottish Diploma in Agriculture at Edinburgh University. Changing track he graduated with a 1st Class Honours in Zoology, and later completed his PhD on ribosome/messenger RNA specificity. Following the completion of his doctorate, Norman spent a year at Rockefeller University, New York as a Sir Henry Wellcome fellow.

Maclean married Jean Kay Smith in 1962. Jean has worked as a medical general practitioner for most of her married life, and together they have two children; Lorna, born in 1965, and Gavin born in 1967

Although reared in a Protestant sect called the 'Exclusive Brethren'; Maclean is an active member of Humanists UK and currently serves as a chair of the local branch.

Maclean began his career as a lecturer at the University of Southampton at the [then] Department of Zoology under the headship of Professor Leslie Brent, was later promoted to a personal chair in Genetics, and eventually went on to become Head of the Department of Biology. During his career he has been a visiting fellow and professor at Universities including; the University of California at Davis; the University of Dalhousie, Canada; the Institute of Hydrobiology, Wuhan, China; the Oceanographic Institute, Cumana, Venezuela; the Institute of Cell Biology, Moscow; and the Biotechnology Institute, Godollo, Hungary.

Norman's entry in "Who's Who" lists his hobbies and interests as: Tennis, Fly Fishing, Gardening and Reading

== Scientific career ==
Maclean's career began with research attempts to understand the developmental switching of globin genes. In the vast majority of vertebrates there are distinct embryonic, foetal and adult globins. His early work was directed at trying to reactivate foetal globin expression, chiefly working with the amphibian Xenopus and chickens. He was, however, unsuccessful in this project; and indeed the problem remains largely unsolved until the present.

Moving on and with the advent of molecular genetics and the availability of cloned gene sequences, Maclean worked – for a time – with Professor Steve Wratten on the use of DNA fingerprinting in understanding aphid infections of cereal crops. For a few years he also collaborated with Dr David Oscier (a medical consultant at Bournemouth Hospital) on the haematological disease of polycythaemia.

Maclean is best known for his pioneering work on transgenic fish, along with his friend and colleague Zuoyan Zhu. Using rainbow trout (Oncorhynchus mykiss), zebrafish (Danio rerio) and tilapia; he used molecular methods to study gene regulation in fish, and was successful in producing growth-enhanced transgenic tilapia for use in the third world. He also collaborated with Aquagene in the United States in producing transgenic tilapia expressing human factor VII (a clotting factor) in their livers.

== Bibliography ==
- Maclean, N. (1976). Control of Gene Expression. Academic Press pp. 348
- Maclean, N. (1977). The Differentiation of Cells. London: Edward Arnold pp. 216
- Maclean, N. (1978). Haemoglobin. Biochemical Education Vol. 7, Issue. 1. London: Edward Arnold pp. 68
- Maclean, N. (1987). Macmillan Dictionary of Genetics & Cell Biology. Macmillan pp. 422
- Maclean, N., Matthews, H.R. & Bradbury, E.M. (1981). DNA- Chromatin and Chromosomes. Oxford: Blackwell Scientific pp. 281
- Maclean, N. ed, Gregory, S. ed, Flavell, R.A. ed. (1983). Eukaryotic Genes. Their Structure, Activity and Regulation. Oxford: Butterworth-Heinemann pp. 474
- Maclean, N. & Hall, B.K. (1987). Cell Commitment and Differentiation. Cambridge: Cambridge University Press pp. 244
- Maclean N ed. (1994). Animals with Novel Genes. Cambridge: Cambridge University Press pp. 266

Maclean's most recent books are all on the subject of British Wildlife. He has studied wildlife as an amateur in over 50 countries around the world and in 2010 he edited a multi-author book entitled "Silent Summer: The State of Wildlife in Britain and Ireland", published by Cambridge University Press. Reviews of the book include comments from Sir David Attenborough; "If we are concerned about the environmental future of Britain and Ireland, then we must know as much as possible about its present condition….That is why this book is so important. It gives us a benchmark….It is invaluable now – and in years to come it will be irreplaceable" and from Gretchen Daily, the Director of the Centre for Conservation Biology, Stanford University; "The book is absolutely terrific. An all-star cast of conservation scientists and practitioners document powerful stories of loss – and of hope for the future – among Britain and Ireland's many non-human inhabitants. Gripping and rigorous – a core foundation for students of Conservation Ecology and Environmental Science".

This is followed by Maclean's single author book "A Less Green and Pleasant Land: our threatened wildlife", published by Cambridge University Press in early 2015. Chris Packham, Naturalist, Wildlife Photographer and TV Presenter of programmes such as Springwatch and Autumnwatch, has written of this book; "The season has changed but the silence is deeper and that's why this important book must be read. It's not a catalogue of doom – it's a pragmatic snapshot of reality and a desperate plea for action. Your action".

In January 2015, as part of a collaborative effort, the multi-author book titled; Austral Ark: the state of wildlife in Australia and New Zealand, edited by Adam Stow, Norman Maclean, and Gregory Holwell was released.

Maclean is now working on a new multi-author book to be published by Cambridge University Press, entitled "The State of the World's Wildlife". It is likely to be published in 2020.

== Selected journal articles ==
- Daru, B.D., Manning, J.C., Boatwright, J.S., Maurin, O., Maclean, N., Schaefer, H, Kuzmina, M. & Van der Bank, M. (2013) Molecular and morphological analysis of subfamily Alooideae (Asphodelaceae) and the inclusion of Chortolirion in Aloe. Taxon 63(1) : 62–76
- Iyengar, A., Diniz, F.M., Gilbert, T., Woodfine, T., Knowles, J. & Maclean, N. (2006) Structure and evolution of the mitochondrial control region in oryx. Mol Phylogenet Evol. 40(1): 305–14
- Diniz, F.M., Maclean, N., Ogawa, M., Cintra, I.H. and Bentzen, P. (2005) The hypervariable domain of the mitochondrial control region in Atlantic spiny lobsters and its potential as a marker for investigating phylogeographic structuring. Mar Biotechnol (NY) 7(5): 462–73
- Iyengar, A., Babu, V.N., Hedges, S., Venkataraman, A.B., Maclean, N. & Morin, P.A. (2005) Phylogeography, genetic structure, and diversity in the dhole (Cuon alpinus). Mol Ecol. 14(8): 2281–97
- Caelers, A., Maclean, N., Hwang, G., Eppler, E. & Reinecke, K. (2005) Expression of endogenous and exogenous growth hormone (GH) messenger (m) RNA in a GH-transgenic tilapia (Oreochromis niloticus). Transgenic Res. 14(1): 95–104
- Hwang, G., Muller, F., Rahman, M.A., Williams, D.W., Murdock, P.J., Pasi, K.J., Goldspink, G., Farahmand, H. & Maclean, N. (2004) Fish as bioreactors: transgene expression of human coagulation factor VII in fish embryos. Mar Biotechnol (NY) 6(5): 485–92
- Harper, G.L., Maclean, N. & Goulson, D. (2003) Microsatellite markers to assess the influence of population size, isolation and demographic change on the genetic structure of the UK butterfly Polyommatus bellargus. Mol Ecol 12(12): 3349–57
- Farahmand, H., Rahman, M.A., Sohm, F., Hwang, G.L. & Maclean, N. (2003) Isolation and expression of tilapia (Oreochromis nilolticus) serine 8-type GnRH coding and regulatory sequences. Gene 304: 97–106
- Hwang, G.L., Azizur Rahman, M., Abdul Razak, S., Sohm, F., Farahmand, H., Smith, A., Brooks, C. & Maclean, N. (2003) Isolation and characterisation of tilapia beta-actin promoter and comparison of its activity with carp beta-actin promoter. Biochim Biophys Acta 1625(1): 11–8
- Allender, C.J., Seehausen, O., Knight, M.E., Turner, G.F. & Maclean, N. (2003) Divergent selection during speciation of Lake Malawi cichlid fishes inferred from parallel radiations in nuptial coloration. Proc. Natl. Acad. Sci. USA 100(24): 14074-14079
- Maclean, N. (2003) Genetically modified fish and their effects on food quality and human health and nutrition. Trends Food Sci. Technol 14(5–8): 242–252
- Maclean, N., Rahman, M.A., Sohm, F., Hwang, G., Iyengar, A., Ayad, H., Smith, A. & Farahmand, H. (2002) Transgenic tilapia and the tilapia genome. Gene 295(2): 265–77
- Molina, A., Iyengar, A., Marins, L.F., Biemar, F., Hanley, S., Maclean, N., Smith, T.J., Martial, J.A. & Muller, M. (2001) Gene structure and promoter function of a teleost ribosomal protein: a tilapia (Oreochromis mossambicus) L18 gene. Biochim Biophys Acta 1520(3): 195–202
- Rahman, M.A., Ronyai, A., Engidaw, B.Z., Jauncey, K., Hwang, G., Smith, A., Roderick, E., Penman, D., Varadi, L. & Maclean, N. (2001) Growth and nutritional trials on transgenic Nile tilapia containing an exogenous fish growth hormone gene. J. Fish Biol 49(1): 62–78
- Rahman, M.A., Hwang, G.L., Razak, S.A., Sohm, F. & Maclean, N. (2000) Copy number related transgene expression and mosaic somatic expression in hemizygous and homozygous transgenic tilapia. Transgenic Res. 9(6): 417–27
- Maclean, N. & Laight, R.J. (2000) Transgenic fish: an evaluation of benefits and risks. Fish and Fisheries 1(2): 146–172
- Rahman, M.A. & Maclean, N. (1999) Growth performance of transgenic tilapia containing an exogenous piscine growth hormone gene. Aquaculture 173(1–4): 333–346
- Rahman, M.A., Mak, R., Ayad, H., Smith, A. & Maclean, N. (1998) Expression of a novel piscine growth hormone gene results in growth enhancement in transgenic tilapia (Oreochromis niloticus). Transgenic Res. 7(5): 357–69
- Hanley, S., Smith, T.J., Muller, F., Maclean, N., Uzbekova, S., Prunet, P. & Breton, B. (1998) Isolation and functional analysis of the histone H3 promoter from atlantic salmon (Salmo salar L). Mol Mar Biol Biotechnol 7(3): 165–72
- Maclean, N. (1998) Regulation and exploitation of transgenes in fish. Mutat Res. 399(2): 255–66
- Iyengar, A., Muller, F. and Maclean, N. (1996) Regulation and expression of transgenes in fish – a review. Transgenic Res. 5(3): 147–66
