= Ed Frank =

American jazz and R&B pianist (1932–1997)

Background information
- Born: Edward Frazier Frank; June 14, 1932; New Orleans, Louisiana, U.S.
- Died: February 13, 1997 (aged 64) New Orleans, Louisiana, U.S.
- Genres: Rhythm & blues, jazz
- Occupations: Pianist, arranger, composer, bandleader
- Years active: 1950s–1997

Ed Frank (June 14, 1932 – February 13, 1997) was an American jazz and rhythm and blues pianist who performed and recorded for more than forty years.

== Early life ==
Edward Frazier "Ed" Frank was born in New Orleans, Louisiana, to Willie Frank and Louise (Frazier) Frank. The Frank family had a long history of traditional jazz musicians, including pioneer Creole musicians Alcide and Bab Frank, the latter known for Bab Frank's Peerless Orchestra. Ed's family moved from central city to the Magnolia Project when he was nine years old. He played violin before switching to piano in his teens. He went to high school at Booker T. Washington, which many important musicians such as Alvin Batiste, Harold Battiste, Clarence Ford, June Gardner, Melvin Lastie, Walter "Popee" Lastie, and Allen Toussaint also attended. Frank influenced his friend Ellis Marsalis, then at Xavier University's Junior School of Music, to play jazz. Frank was a scholarship student at Grambling College before dropping out to get married.

== Studio musician ==
Frank's first recording opportunity was with Smiley Lewis after Tuts Washington left his band. Dave Bartholomew subsequently hired him for studio work. He was a regular at the Dew Drop Inn, often sitting in on late-night jazz sessions. As a member of the house band at Cosimo Matassa's J&M Studios, he performed on hundreds of R&B and rock 'n' roll records produced by Dave Bartholomew and others. The J&M studio band consisted of Lee Allen on tenor sax, Alvin "Red" Tyler on baritone sax, Ernest McLean or Justin Adams on guitar, Earl Palmer on drums, and either Frank himself or Salvador Doucette on piano. After Doucette went into the military to play French horn, Frank played on most sessions. "Red" Tyler recalled: "We were the nucleus of all the rock that came out of New Orleans– the R&B records which came out of New Orleans." Frank recorded with Pee Wee Crayton, Lloyd Price, Fats Domino, Elmore James, Big Joe Turner, Little Richard, Smiley Lewis, Bobby Charles, Shirley and Lee, Dave Bartholomew, Tommy Ridgely, Leroy Jones, Lillian Boutté, Chuck Carbo, Bobby Mitchell, The Spiders, Art Neville, Lee Allen, Clarence Ford, Wendell Brunious, Wallace Davenport and Smokey Johnson, among others.

When he was 23, Frank suffered a ruptured blood vessel in his head that partially paralyzed his left arm and hand. He resumed recording studio work after four months. He taught himself to play single-hand melodies and bass notes the way a stride piano player might, thus developing his own technique. "If you listened to him, you never thought he had one hand," said bassist Chuck Badie. "His chords were so full, it sounded like he was playing with two hands."

== Career ==
Like many New Orleans musicians, Frank was a jazz musician who played R&B to make a living. Rounder Records producer Scott Billington said of Ed Frank: "His was a very elegant approach to R&B that made use of his extensive knowledge of jazz harmony." After their gigs musicians from all over town gathered at late-night places where jazz was played. Frank later recalled: "I had Blanche Thomas, Chuck Badie, and Ed Blackwell, and we did an after-hours thing for the barmaids, musicians, dancers, and waiters." He also played bop with Earl Palmer at the Texas Lounge. When white musicians Al Belletto and Benny Clement came by to jam, Belletto maintained, "they let us sit in a couple of times", until the police ran them out for playing with black musicians. Despite segregation enforced by law, black and white musicians often played together in the underground modern jazz scene of the early 1950s. White musician Don Suhor played clarinet in traditional jazz bands, but switched to alto sax to join in after-hours bop and cool jazz jam sessions with musicians that included Ed Frank, Ellis Marsalis, Brew Moore, and Al Belletto.

In 1960, Frank went to Houston to work for Don Robey at Duke/ Peacock records and play with Arnett Cobb's big band. There he recorded with Bobby "Blue" Bland, Junior Parker and others. He was also Robey's New Orleans A&R man, on the lookout for local talent. When New Orleans pianist James Booker got stranded in Houston, Frank got him work on recording sessions. Booker had been influenced in R&B and jazz by Frank and Tuts Washington.

Frank returned to New Orleans in 1964. He played jazz in a band called The Crescents (later the Afro-Caribbean Sextet) with Ed Blackwell on drums, Richard “Didimus” Washington on percussion, Eluard Burt on flute, Otis Deverney on bass. In the mid-1960s Ed Frank’s jazz band featuring Red Tyler on sax, Chuck Badie on bass, and June Gardner on drums played at the Forest Inn and the Haven Night Club. They opened Mason’s V.I.P. Club on S. Claiborne Avenue in 1967. Frank was also involved in the traditional jazz scene, with regular gigs at the Palm Court Jazz Cafe and Preservation Hall. He worked with horn men Thomas Jefferson, Wallace Davenport, and others. He toured and recorded in France with Davenport. He played and toured with Lillian Boutté for the last nine years of his life. In 1978 Frank teamed with bassist Gerald Adams, and sax/clarinetist Clarence Ford, performing in the lounge at the Marriott Hotel on Canal Street in New Orleans. This longtime engagement featured traditional jazz with occasional modern jazz numbers. Frank was a regular in the Jazz Tent at the New Orleans Jazz & Heritage Festival, often performing with his friend Smokey Johnson.

Frank was also known for his horn arrangements. Music writer Kalamu Ya Salaam said: "His arrangements are models of clear lyrical voicings." Producer Scott Billington called him "a master of voicings for horns" who "knew the sonics of each instrument". He wrote arrangements for Dr. John, Chuck Carbo, the Dirty Dozen Brass Band, and other artists.

Frank died of cancer in New Orleans on February 13, 1997, aged 64. His survivors included his wife, Dolores S. Frank, and five daughters.

== Discography ==
The New New Orleans Music: Jump Jazz- The Ed Frank Quintet/ Ramsey McLean & The Survivors (Rounder Records 1988)

The Ed Frank Quartet Featuring Clarence Ford (504 Records 2015)
