= Clarence Ford =

American musician

Background information
- Born: Clarence Joseph Ford, Sr. December 16, 1929; New Orleans, Louisiana, US
- Died: August 9, 1994 (aged 64) New Orleans, Louisiana, US
- Genres: Rhythm and blues, Jazz
- Occupations: Alto, tenor, baritone, and soprano saxophone, clarinet, flute
- Years active: c.1945 – 1994
- Formerly of: Eureka Brass Band

Clarence Joseph Ford, Sr. (December 16, 1929 – August 9, 1994) was an American saxophonist and clarinetist, who played and recorded with many of New Orleans' leading R&B and jazz artists in a career spanning more than 40 years.

== Life ==
Clarence Ford was born December 16, 1929, at Charity Hospital in New Orleans to Hampy Ford and Elouise A. Gabriel Ford. Hampy was a laborer who later worked in road construction for the Works Progress Administration. Elouise was a member of the musical Gabriel family. Clarence Ford's great-grandfather Narcisse Gabriel emigrated from Santo Domingo, Dominican Republic, to New Orleans in 1856. Narcisse was a bass player who earned his living as a bricklayer. His son Martin "Big Manny" Gabriel was also a bricklayer, and played cornet. Big Manny formed the early jazz band The National Orchestra around 1903. The band included Big Manny on accordion and later cornet, Johnny St. Cyr on guitar, and Freddie Keppard, then on violin. The New Orleans Gabriel family lived at 409 N. Miro Street. Elouise's brothers were musicians. Little Manny played saxophone and clarinet, and was a drummer with Louis Armstrong before the latter moved to Chicago to join King Oliver's band in 1922. Clarence was a pianist and Percy a bassist. Little Manny started nephew Clarence Ford and son Charles on clarinet as young teenagers. Charles remembered, "I had five brothers and two were already on trumpet. My father said, 'You all can't play the same instrument.' He said, 'You and Clarence [Charles' cousin Clarence Ford] are gonna play saxophone.' Well, the key to playing saxophone is to learn the clarinet; the clarinet is the mother instrument to teach you how to play saxophone." Big Manny's sons Martin ("Little Manny") and Percy Gabriel moved their families to Detroit, Michigan in the 1940s to work in the automobile industry. Charles moved to Detroit at age 14, later playing with Lionel Hampton, Nancy Wilson, J.C. Heard, and Aretha Franklin. He returned to New Orleans in 2009 to play in the Preservation Hall Jazz Band. Ford attended Booker T. Washington High School with trumpeter Melvin Lastie and pianist/ singer Joe Jones. Jones organized a big band including Ford and Lastie that played at their graduation. Ford used the $6 he earned to join AFM Local 496, the Negro Musicians Union. According to Deacon John Moore, the first black president of Local 174- 496, the all-white union Local 174 union originally barred black performers from joining. Enterprising musicians of color secured a union charter for the Gulf Coast region using addresses of its members' vacation homes. They formed AFM Local 496, the Negro Musicians Union. Once the charter was granted, members moved its headquarters to New Orleans. The forced merger of Local 496 and Local 174 finally came in 1969. It took nearly thirty years for union Local 174- 496 to elect Deacon John Moore as its first black president in 2007.

Clarence Ford had his initial professional job at age 15 with the Eureka Brass Band in 1945 when he played E-flat clarinet at a Mardi Gras gig. He said in an interview that at the time he only knew three songs-- "The Saints", "Lady Be Good", and "Panama". In 1948 Ford joined Wallace Davenport's Bebop Jockeys after switching to alto saxophone. He bought his first alto sax at Werlein's for Music in New Orleans, and his idol was Charlie Parker. Ford joined the Johnson Brothers band in 1949. The Johnson brothers Ray and Plas, Jr. were from a musical family and had been professionals since they played their first gig at ages 13 and 12 years old respectively. Ford recorded for the first time on the Johnson Brothers' De Luxe Records release "Mellow Mama" in August 1949. The session was supervised by De Luxe A&R man Paul Gayten, and, in addition to Ford, featured Harold Battiste on baritone sax, Lloyd Lambert on bass, Reynold Richards on piano, and Ed Blackwell on drums. Clarence Ford also worked as an orderly at Charity Hospital for $20 a week, in addition to his music dates, to support his wife and two children. The Johnson Brothers band broke up when Plas went on the road with Charles Brown's band in 1951. Ford left New Orleans for Detroit to stay with his uncle Percy Gabriel. He got a job at the Ford Motor plant but was laid off after two months. When he returned to New Orleans he went to work recording with Dave Bartholomew, whose band included Bartholomew on trumpet, Earl Palmer on drums, Red Tyler, Clarence Hall and Meyer Kennedy on saxophones, Salvador Doucette on piano, and Frank Fields on bass. Ford played on recordings by Dave Bartholomew's band, and other artists he produced. He worked a day job with Joe Jones at a New Orleans paper company. Ford worked with the Lloyd Lambert Orchestra, including a month-long stay at the Dew Drop Inn in May 1953. In 1954 he and friend trumpeter Dalton "Red" Rousseau were hired by manager Hosea Hill to play in Guitar Slim's band. Ford was recruited as a baritone sax player and, since he did not own a baritone sax, borrowed one from friend Ellis Marsalis, who had switched to piano. On the road Slim rode ahead in his Cadillac, and the band rode behind with the equipment in a station wagon. Ford stayed with Guitar Slim until 1956, then returned home to New Orleans. He played around New Orleans, often sitting in at the Dew Drop Inn, playing tenor sax for $10 a night with Earl King on guitar and James Booker on piano. He worked days at the Dixie Beer brewery making $6 a day. Tenor sax man Herb Hardesty approached Ford in January 1957 about joining Fats Domino's band. Ford came aboard to play baritone sax.

On February 2, 1957, Domino and his band, including Clarence Ford, played on the Perry Como Show. Fats appeared on the piano, but the band performed behind a curtain, as Como, like Ed Sullivan (on whose show the band had previously played), thought too many black men on camera might incite racial troubles. Fats and his band continued to make appearances on network television and in Hollywood films. Though they were the most popular rock and roll outfit in the United States with many white fans, Jim Crow restrictions kept them from staying in white hotels and eating at white restaurants and forced them to use "For Colored Only" facilities. The venues they played were segregated by police. At their shows crowds were separated into whites on the floor and blacks in the balcony, or by a painted line or rope down the center of the theater. In 1957, Ford's first year with the outfit, the Domino band traveled 13,000 miles across the United States and played 355 shows at sold-out venues whenever they performed.

Ford stayed with Fats Domino's band for 15 years. By 1960 he was bandleader for the Domino band. One of his duties was to cue Fats to what key songs were played in. He also marshaled the band, handing out schedules and advising them what uniforms to wear. By this time he was playing baritone and tenor sax (and clarinet on "Mardi Gras In New Orleans"). During his last 10 years in the Domino band Ford never made more than $275 a week, his small pay increases unable to keep with the cost of living. Featured soloists Herb Hardesty, Lee Allen, and Dave Bartholomew made more money. For the other musicians the pay was, Clarence Ford said, "a turkey for me and a weenie for you." During his time with Fats Domino, Ford and the band played in Mexico, Jamaica, France, Italy, England, and Germany. Early on the morning of May 27, 1970 near Natchitoches, La. the band station wagon, driven by bassist Jimmy Davis, was involved in a fatal accident with a tractor- trailer that killed Davis and seriously injured Clarence Ford and fellow sax man Buddy Hagans. Ford spent two weeks in the hospital in Shreveport, La. with severe back and leg injuries and eight fractured ribs. In the decades he toured Fats Domino lost many band members to car accidents and drugs. One musician joked that "Fats has killed two or three bands." In a 1972 interview Domino said of former band members, "A couple of ‘em got killed, a couple of ‘em died." Clarence Ford walked with a cane in his later years due to injuries from the automobile accident in 1970.

After the accident Ford never returned to the Domino band. Back in New Orleans he went into Dixieland jazz, playing clarinet with Papa French and Bob French, and also sitting in with Brother Cornbread. He was one of three Domino band alumni, along with drummer Cornelius "Tenoo" Coleman and bassist Lawrence Guyton, in Clarence "Frogman" Henry's band in the 1970s. He also played modern jazz dates with June Gardner, and toured with trumpeter Alvin Alcorn's jazz band in the middle 1970s. In 1978 Ford teamed in a jazz trio with bassist Gerald Adams, brother of Placide and Justin Adams, and pianist Ed Frank, performing in the lounge at the Marriott Hotel on Canal Street in New Orleans. This enduring engagement featured traditional jazz with occasional modern jazz numbers. The trio, like bands when Ford started out, was "playing a little bit of everything." Ford's gig at the Marriott was highlighted in a Billboard magazine listing entitled "The Clubs That Keep The Crescent City Jumping." He kept the jazz trio gig at the hotel until his death.

== Studio musician ==
Talented on alto, baritone, soprano, and tenor saxophone, as well as clarinet, Clarence Ford's skillful musicianship made him one of the most sought after studio musicians in New Orleans of his era. Starting in the mid-1950s Ford recorded on sessions for Fats Domino, Pee Wee Crayton, Little Richard, Snooks Eaglin, Bobby Mitchell, Shirley and Lee, Joe Tex, Professor Longhair, Smiley Lewis, Bobby Charles, Earl King, Jessie Hill, Guitar Slim, Alvin Alcorn, Labelle, Charles Brown, Art Neville, Aaron Neville, Little Sonny Jones, Roosevelt Sykes, Dave "Fat Man" Williams, and more for a variety of labels. He is featured on the 2015 release by 504 Records "The Ed Frank Quartet Featuring Clarence Ford", recorded in 1991 and 1992. Ford worked with New Orleans producers Dave Bartholomew and Allen Toussaint, among others.

== Reputation and legacy ==
New Orleans music writer Geraldine Wyckoff said Ford was so versatile he could play "five different jobs in 24 hours, each with a different style of music— brass band, traditional jazz, big band swing, R&B, and contemporary jazz." He was known as an exceptional modern jazz saxophonist.

== Personal life ==
Clarence Ford married Alice Genevieve Wiltz in April 1950 in New Orleans. The Fords' son Louis is an accomplished clarinetist, saxophonist, and teacher who studied with Kidd Jordan and noted clarinetist and educator Alvin Baptiste. Grandson Thaddeus Ford is a trumpeter and keyboardist who took lessons from Clarence Ford before studying music at Southern University in Baton Rouge and the University of New Orleans. Clarence Ford died of a heart attack after a trio gig at the Marriott Hotel on August 9, 1994.
