= Walter "Papoose" Nelson =

American R&B guitarist (1932–1962)

Background information
- Also known as: Papoose
- Born: Walter Charles Nelson Jr. July 26, 1932; New Orleans, Louisiana, US
- Died: February 28, 1962 (aged 29) New York City, US
- Genre: Rhythm and blues
- Occupation: Guitarist
- Years active: c.1948 – 1962

Walter Charles Nelson Jr. (July 26, 1932 – February 28, 1962), known as Walter "Papoose" Nelson, was an American R&B guitarist, best known for playing with Fats Domino, and on many of his hit records.

== Early life ==
Papoose Nelson was born in New Orleans, Louisiana and grew up in the Tremé neighborhood of the Sixth Ward of New Orleans, Louisiana. His father, Walter "Black Walter" Nelson, Sr. (1904-1984) had a long career as a jazz and R&B guitarist, playing with Smiley Lewis, Isidore "Tuts" Washington, Brother Cornbread, George Lewis, Alcide "Slow Drag" Pavageau, Herb Morand, Alphonse Picou, and many others. Nelson, Sr. and his wife Edna raised eight children including Walter, Jr., Dorothy (who married singer/songwriter and producer Jessie Hill), and younger brother Lawrence, a singer/songwriter who recorded in the early 1960s as Prince La La. Mac Rebennack said of the Nelsons, "They're all from the housing projects in the Ninth Ward which is the ultimate in ghettoes in New Orleans - bad conditions, gang wars, just a totally bad and violent situation. They've had very, very rough lives." Papoose and his brother Lawrence learned to play guitar from their father, who also taught music to Smiley Lewis and Henry Roeland Byrd.

== Career ==
In March 1948 club owner Michael Tessitore hired piano player Byrd to play at his Caldonia Nite Club, giving him the nickname Professor Longhair—the title of “Professor” had been given to New Orleans piano players since the days of Storyville, and “Longhair” referred to Byrd's relaxed coiffure. Longhair's regular gig at the Caldonia also included sidemen Eddie "Apeman" Black on saxophone, Clarence "Big Slick" Fritz on drums, and seventeen-year-old Papoose Nelson on guitar. Longhair later recalled, "Papoose was with me in ’49… His daddy was a help to me… and by him taking up so much time with me, showing me bars and different things… I didn’t figure it was no more than right to help his son out… he was about the best guitar player." New Orleans drummer Charles "Hungry" Williams remembered seeing Professor Longhair and his band that included Papoose Nelson at the Pepper Pot in Gretna, Louisiana. Playing in clubs with Longhair's band Nelson acquired a lifelong addiction to heroin. He also played on some of Professor Longhair's earliest recordings. Professor Longhair remembered suggesting Nelson to Fats Domino for his band, “because I didn’t have any work. He’d come back if I needed him."

Nelson joined Fats Domino's band in late 1950. In January 1951 he worked his first studio session for Fats Domino, "Tired of Crying" backed with "What’s The Matter Baby", at Cosimo Matassa's studio. Nelson would play on most of Domino's recording sessions for the rest of the decade, sometimes contributing arrangements. Dave Bartholomew remembered when recording Domino's "I'm Walkin'" that the guitar figure followed Fats' left hand. "Papoose was responsible for that arrangement", said Bartholomew. "I wanted something simpler but he said, 'No, let's put in a sixth note.' We did and that's what made 'I’m Walkin' so catchy."

In addition to playing on Professor Longhair recordings, Nelson worked as a studio guitarist for some of Dave Bartholomew's releases. His other studio work included Bartholomew's production of Smiley Lewis, T-Bone Walker, and Roosevelt Sykes' Imperial Records sides. He also played for pianist and producer Paul Gayten's Clarence "Frogman" Henry sessions for Chess Records.

In 1958 Nelson and the core of the Domino band led by saxophonist Herb Hardesty cut an album that remained unissued until 2012. Though mostly instrumentals, the recordings included two songs co-written and with vocals by Papoose, "It Must Be Wonderful" and "Why Did We Have To Part". Mac Rebennack opined, "That m…. f…. could sing.." Billboard Magazine on January 6, 1962, noted, “Little Bit Of Everything" was an "attractive bluesy theme sung by Walter Nelson in relaxed, showmany fashion." From 1959 through 1962 six singles from the session were released on the Federal, Mutual, and Paoli record labels. Nelson recorded his last session with Fats Domino in June 1959. Domino would later recall his band with Buddy Hagans, Billy Diamond, Cornelius "Tenoo" Coleman, Wendell Duconge, and Papoose Nelson as being his "best ever."

== Reputation and legacy ==
Nelson had the respect of his fellow musicians. Band leader Dave Bartholomew called him a “great guitar player. Oh he was out of sight." "Papoose had a big influence on me," Bartholomew said, "In the studio, I could feel him, man. He added so much more to it- a lot of feeling." Jazz and brass band drummer and singer Lionel Batiste said, "“Papoose was a better player than his daddy, except for the blues – you can’t beat those old men for playing the blues." Singer and pianist Oliver Morgan, who knew the Nelson family from the mid- 1940s, said, "Papoose played more like his father... They played a lot of heavy chords. I wouldn't say that (Prince) La La was as good of a player as Papoose— Papoose was a legend around here." Fat's Domino's bass player and road manager Billy Diamond said of Papoose Nelson that his driving-but-mellow style became "the backbone of our band." Saxophonist Red Tyler agreed that "Nelson was pretty hip to what was going on, but he did it from his head, which was not bad. As I say he was very good.” Mac Rebennack characterized the signature New Orleans sound, also known as the Cosimo sound, as light horns and piano, strong drums, heavy bass and guitar, and strong vocals. "It took the guitar doubling the bass line, which was kind of a Papoose Nelson/ Dave Bartholomew sound in my book." He described Nelson "a real soulful player".

Nelson appeared with the Fats Domino band on film including in “Shake Rattle and Rock” in 1956.

Nelson also gave guitar lessons, most notably to Mac Rebennack (Dr. John). "Papoose was my idol", Rebennack said. "I started going down to watch Fats Domino playing at the Cadillac Club (corner of St. Claude and Poland Avenue). I used to drive Papoose crazy standing in front of him all night, watching how his hands went." When the band took a break, Rebennack recalled, "I used to ask him to teach me how to do that stuff." After Nelson took him on as a student, he said, "Papoose listened to my chops and said, 'Man, you can't play that outta-meter, foot-beater jive and get a job.' He insisted I learn to read music, and got me to listening to guys like Billy Butler and Mickey Baker." Papoose would play jazz and blues licks, having Rebennack play straight chords behind him. "He would never let me take a solo. He got me disciplined to where I was just playin' chords for hours and hours. That had a great bearing on my music in general."

== Personal life ==
Mac Rebennack observed, "he (Papoose) was a guy who used to like to be high. He would get up in the morning and drop four bennies, five redbirds, drink a bottle of beer, smoke some weed and shoot some heroin, that'd be just to wake him up in the morning." In his years with Fats Domino's band Nelson missed recording dates and performances due to jail time resulting from missing child support payments, and drug arrests. Domino often bailed him out.

On February 28, 1962, four days before the scheduled appearance of Fats Domino and his band on "The Ed Sullivan Show", road manager Billy Diamond arrived at the Hotel Theresa in Harlem to pick up the members of Fats Domino's band. Getting no response from a knock on Papoose Nelson's door Diamond requested the bell captain open the door. They found the guitarist lying on the bed with a needle in his arm, dead from a heroin overdose at the age of twenty-nine. Domino had Diamond call Nelson's father, then the police. Aware that a drug overdose death could damage Domino's reputation and cancel the Sullivan date, Diamond claimed he bribed a "Jet" magazine reporter to write that Nelson died of a heart attack.

The Olympia Brass Band led a traditional jazz funeral for Walter C. "Papoose" Nelson, Jr. on March 10, 1962, with family, friends, and members the American Federation of Musicians Local No. 496 present. Saxophonist Harold Dejan as a teenager had played with the Olympia Serenaders, an ensemble modeled after the original Olympia Brass Band of the 1880s. He revived the Olympia Brass Band, which played in the traditional parade style. Nelson's was their first jazz funeral. The procession began at Alphonse Picou's Restaurant and Bar in Treme. Papoose's wife Earline Hall Nelson and their four children, his parents Walter, Sr. and Edna Nelson, brothers Lawrence, Warren, and four sisters attended the service. Fats Domino and his band were on the road and missed the funeral. Papoose is buried in Holt Cemetery in New Orleans.
