= The Zion Harmonizers =

American gospel music group

Background information
- Origin: New Orleans, Louisiana, U.S.A.
- Genres: Gospel
- Years active: 1938–present
- Labels: Avant, Gotham, Booker, Flying Fish, Pontchartrain, Sound of New Orleans, Mardi Gras, and C & G Music Partners, Gospel Heritage

The Zion Harmonizers is an American gospel music group founded in 1938 and based in New Orleans, Louisiana.

== Early years ==
Benjamin J. Maxon, Jr. (February 11, 1924- August 18, 2005), a teenager living in the Zion City neighborhood of New Orleans in 1938, organized a group of his friends he called the Zion Harmonizers to sing quartet- style gospel music. Original members included brother Joe Maxon, Russell Parker, Edward Jones, and Winston Phillips. Maxon had sung, along with siblings Joseph and Lucille, in the Heaven Bound Quartet under the guidance of aunt Alberta French Johnson, a member of the Southern Harps. The Southern Harps were an esteemed and popular female quartet that for a time included Bessie Griffin, later a well-known solo gospel performer. The Zion Harmonizers toured the state and learned the techniques of gospel performance as the opening act for the Southern Harps. They participated in singing contests, in which the winners were chosen for their vocal harmonies and technique. The Harmonizers sang quartet gospel music, and to this day rely considerably on their background of old-time a cappella style and the use of four-part harmonies. In 1942 Benjamin Maxon met Sherman Washington (December 13, 1925 - March 14, 2011) while working at Higgins Shipyard. New Orleans was the location of Higgins Industries, which manufactured the Higgins boats that were used in the European and Pacific theaters in World War Two. Higgins hired black, white, male and female workers, with equal pay for equal work. The two men discovered their mutual interest in gospel singing, and Maxon asked Washington to join the Zion Harmonizers. Maxon recalled, "We had a closeness as a bunch of men that many blood brothers did not have. I remember times when I would pawn my overcoat to get us bus fare for a program."

== Building a reputation ==
When Maxon was called to preach in 1948, Russell Parker took over as manager of the group for a short time. Sherman Washington succeeded Parker as manager. He was unsure of himself at first. He later remembered, "I was scared. I felt like I wouldn't be able to do it. It's a lot of responsibility." Washington sang with the Zion Harmonizers with a few interruptions until 2006. He also worked for forty-three years as a truck driver for a local construction company. He said in an interview, "Gospel singing, unless you get something going real good, get somebody to front for you, a good manager, a booking road manager, you ain't gonna make it. It's rough out there." The Harmonizers continued to recruit new singers as members left when called to preach or were drafted into military service. Sherman Washington's younger brother Nolan (August 15, 1931 - May 19, 1997) returned to New Orleans in 1946, after singing in gospel groups while living in Chicago, and joined The Zion Harmonizers. He said the group broke up shortly after. According to author Burt Feintuch's history of the Zion Harmonizers, Joe Maxon formed the Zion City Harmonizers in 1947. Brothers Hayward "Chuck" Carbo (January 11, 1926 – July 11, 2008) and Leonard "Chick" Carbo (December 28, 1927 - August 18, 1998) joined this group after being recruited by Nolan Washington, then a member. Carbo remembered the members of the Zion City Harmonizers when he and brother Chick came aboard as being Joe Maxon, Nolan Washington, Winston Phillips, Matthew West, and Oliver Howard, with Henry Wicks on piano. He said that before he became a member the group was a "shouting quartet." His smoother style gave another dimension to their performances. Nolan Washington provided any shouting the group needed, Carbo said, in the tradition of the Five Blind Boys of Mississippi's Archie Brownlee, at that time living in New Orleans. According to Nolan Washington, his brother Sherman organized the Zion Travelers in 1948 or 1949, not to be confused with the Zion Travelers of Baton Rouge or Zion Travelers of Los Angeles. Chuck Carbo recalled the Zion City Harmonizers taking on the Zion Travelers in singing competitions during that time. Otis Brown was a gospel promoter who managed and booked the Zion City Harmonizers. He changed the group's name to the Delta Southernaires. In 1953 promoter Phyllis Boone suggested to J&M Studio owner Cosimo Matassa that he audition the Delta Southernaires. The group, consisting by that time of the Carbo brothers (lead vocals), Joe Maxon (tenor), Matthew “Mac” West (baritone), and Oliver Howard (bass) sang "John The Revelator" and "Bye And Bye". Matassa liked their sound and urged the group to return, but to sing rhythm & blues rather than gospel. Guitarist and accompanist Adolph Smith worked with the group on two songs he wrote for the recording. Renamed the Spiders for the release, they recorded for Imperial Records at their first session. "I Didn't Want To Do It" went to #3 on the R&B charts and "You're The One" followed it to #8. The Delta Southernaires tried to keep their foray into R&B quiet, but a local disc jockey gave them away to his audience. Gospel music was no longer an option for the group.

Sherman Washington went into the military during the Korean war from 1952 through 1954. After his discharge he reorganized the Zion Harmonizers. Nolan Washington served in the military from 1954 through 1956. Upon his return to New Orleans he rejoined the group now led by his brother. In 1956 Sherman Washington began broadcasting a gospel music radio program on WMRY New Orleans, later moving to WYLD, that lasted for over 45 years. The program, which featured information on the local gospel community and played local gospel records, served as the region's de facto gospel town hall.

== Recording ==
The Zion Harmonizers went to Dallas, Texas in 1956 to make their first recording for Avant Records. The personnel was Rev. Percy Simpson, Nolan Washington, Charles Taylor (tenors), Sherman Washington (baritone), and John Hawkins (bass); with an unknown guitarist. The Avant disc featured "Lord Don't Leave Me" and "Lord, I'll Go". The group continued to build their reputation. The Zion Harmonizers sang to praise and spread the word of God. In 1958 the group went to Philadelphia under the guidance of the Dixie Hummingbirds' Ira Tucker to record for Gotham Records. The personnel on the session were Lewis Johnson (high tenor), Nolan Washington and Charles Taylor (tenors), Joseph Maxon (baritone), and John Hawkins (bass); with Howard Carroll (guitar) The two sides of the disc were "Working The Road" and "In The End", both songs written by members of the Dixie Hummingbirds. Guitarist Howard Carroll was also a Hummingbirds member. The Zion Harmonizers made their next recording at Cosimo Matassa's studio in New Orleans for the Booker Records label in 1964. "God Will Take Care Of You" backed with "I Can Hear My Savior Calling" featured Joseph Maxon (tenor), Sherman Washington (baritone), Richard Jones (lead), Howard Bowie, and Lewis Johnson. The Zion Harmonizers made their first LP in 1974 at Jazz City Studio in New Orleans for Flying Fish Records. The album, consisting of traditional spirituals, featured Sherman Washington (lead), Lewis Johnson and Howard Bowie (tenors), John Hawkins (bass), Henry Warrick (baritone and guitar), with Allen Butler singing lead on two cuts. The group went on to record albums for Pontchartrain Records, Sound of New Orleans, Mardi Gras Records, and C & G Music Partners. The rare, early recordings have come out on early gospel compilations, including the Gospel Heritage reissue collection from England.

== Later years ==
The Zion Harmonizers have been a part of the New Orleans Jazz & Heritage Festival from the first staging of the event in 1970. When the festival moved to the Fair Grounds in 1972 Sherman Washington was asked by Jazz Fest producer/director Quint Davis to organize a Gospel Tent. Davis said, "He was a true man of God who was not in it to advance himself or build an empire. He worked through his community and spiritual connections to put it all together." Sherman Washington, known as "Godfather of the Gospel Tent", died on March 14, 2011, at age 85.

Following Washington's death, management of the Gospel Tent was transferred to others in the gospel community. Brazella Briscoe, a Zion Harmonizer for close to a quarter century, took over leadership of the group. Briscoe brings in new members with an eye on the future. His plan is to make certain the Zion Harmonizer tradition continues. The group today performs a variety of gospel music styles, including a capella spirituals and traditional hymns, as well as R&B- inspired church rockers. Their performances at the New Orleans Jazz & Heritage Festival have led to tours in Canada, Switzerland, the Netherlands, Italy, and Austria, Belgium, Germany, France, and Portugal. Singer Aaron Neville sometimes joined the Zion Harmonizers at their Gospel Tent performances.

Gospel music historian Lynn Abbott called the Zion Harmonizers "a pillar of the New Orleans gospel community." Though now having an international reputation, "Most of their programs and song services are still conducted in small churches within a hundred-mile radius of the city.”
