= Lloyd Lambert =

American R&B and jazz bandleader (1928–1995)

- Lloyd Lambert

Background information
- Also known as: "Luscious" Lloyd Lambert
- Born: Lloyd Joseph Lambert; June 4, 1928; Thibodaux, Louisiana, U.S.
- Died: October 31, 1995 (aged 67) New Orleans, Louisiana, U.S.
- Genres: Jazz, rhythm and blues
- Occupations: Musician, bandleader
- Instruments: Bass, piano, trumpet
- Years active: c.1930s – c.1990s

Lloyd Lambert (June 4, 1928 – October 31, 1995) was an American R&B and jazz bandleader and bassist who played and recorded for over 50 years.

== Early years ==
Lambert's first job came at age nine playing piano with Teddy Johnson's band. He said, "My father used to play guitar with Teddy and they were good friends. Teddy told my dad, 'Prof he sounds pretty good. Bring your son out every Saturday when we get these little jobs.' Teddy had a good band, he used to hire a lot of musicians out of New Orleans like Kid Howard and Kid Clayton." Lambert stayed with the Johnson band until he was 14 years old.

== 1950s ==
After instruction on trumpet from his father, Lambert joined and toured the south with Hosea Hill's Serenaders. Hill was a scion of a family that owned land and farmed sugar cane. He opened the Sugar Bowl bar in 1932 in Thibodaux. Although not a musician, he formed Hosea Hill's Serenaders with Thibodaux's best musicians as the bar's house band. On nights when the band did not play at the bar he booked them at other nearby venues and in New Orleans. Hill often booked acts in conjunction with friend and business associate Frank Painia, who owned the Dew Drop Inn in New Orleans. He took over Painia's management of flamboyant singer and guitarist Eddie "Guitar Slim" Jones when Painia ran into trouble with his booking license.

In 1953, Lambert switched to bass and the Serenaders became the Lloyd Lambert Orchestra, touring briefly with a young Ray Charles. Guitar Slim had been playing with bands Frank Paina and promoter Percy Stovall put together. Huey "Piano" Smith, who had accompanied Slim, took him to meet Johnny Vincent, talent scout and producer with Specialty Records. After Slim signed with Specialty Records Lloyd Lambert's outfit began backing him on the road and in the studio. Since Lambert's band already had pianist Lawrence Cotton, Smith was forced out. Released in 1953, Guitar Slim's "The Things That I Used to Do" topped the US Billboard R&B chart for six weeks and became the best selling R&B record in 1954. Lambert played on all of Guitar Slim's Specialty recordings and the majority of his work on Atlantic.

The Lloyd Lambert Orchestra toured with Guitar Slim until his death in 1959. The band featured Lambert (bass), Joe Tillman, Gus Fontenette, and Clarence Ford (saxes), John Gerard (trumpet), Oscar Moore (drums), and Lawrence Cotton on piano, with Guitar Slim on guitar and vocals. Lambert made a few of his own recordings including a Specialty Records single in 1955 with two instrumentals, "King Cotton" and "Heavy Sugar".

== Instrumentalist ==
Lambert was an early proponent of the electric bass beginning in the 1950s. The first electric bass was introduced by the Fender guitar company in 1951, and the Gibson company brought one out in 1953. Though Lambert played upright on "The Things That I Used To Do", all of his later work with Guitar Slim was on electric bass. Lambert later claimed, "I was the first guy in the state of Louisiana to play one".

== Studio work ==
With Guitar Slim on Specialty Records, Lambert worked as a session musician on many Specialty and other labels' recordings. He backed Little Richard on "Tutti Frutti", Richard's first hit, and "Long Tall Sally". He also recorded with such artists as T-Bone Walker, Big Joe Turner, and Ray Charles. "They all would come to New Orleans to record," Lambert recalled.

== Later years ==
After Guitar Slim's death, Lambert worked as a bandleader with Carol Fran and Nappy Brown. In 1960 he moved to Houston, where he worked as a session musician for Duke/ Peacock Records, and played in jazz saxophonist Arnett Cobb's band for eight years. He also befriended Andre Previn who was directing the Houston Symphony. Previn convinced Lambert to switch back to upright bass, using him in his small jazz group. At the suggestion of his brother pianist Phamous, he moved back to New Orleans in 1973, performing with several Dixieland bands on Bourbon Street. Lambert recalled at the time he played with "every kind of band." He also worked a variety of recording sessions, including with Snooks Eaglin, James Thunderbird Davis, Earl "Fatha" Hines, Wallace Davenport and Lillian Boutte.

Lambert put together his own Dixieland band in 1981, playing at the Maison Bourbon jazz club, and working in the French Quarter into the 1990s. He played and recorded with the Alliance Hall Dixieland Band and The N'Orleans Statesmen, among others. He also toured worldwide with Lillian Boutte. "I never try to shine," he said of his style, "I just go up and do the job."

Lambert died of cancer at age 67 in New Orleans on October 31, 1995. He was buried in Thibodaux at Moses Cemetery. His survivors included his wife, five children, and grandson New Orleans bluesman Kipori 'Baby Wolf' Woods.
