= Adolph Smith =

American musician

- Adolph Smith

Background information
- Born: Adolph Smith; May 16, 1926; New Orleans, Louisiana, U.S.
- Died: July 31, 2004 (aged 78) New Orleans, Louisiana, U.S.
- Genres: gospel, rhythm and blues
- Occupations: Musician, singer, composer
- Instrument: Guitar
- Years active: c. 1950s – c. 1970s
- Labels: Imperial, Aladdin, Specialty, Sapphire, Sue

Adolph Smith (May 16, 1926 – July 31, 2004) was an American rhythm and blues guitarist, singer, and composer, whose songs were recorded by many artists.

== Early life ==
Adolph Smith was born in New Orleans, Louisiana, to Hastings J. Smith and Rebecca Rachael Frank. Hastings was a stevedore on a freight wharf on the Mississippi River who was born in 1904 in Verrettville, Louisiana, a community founded as a freedmen's town by former enslaved African Americans. Adolph was the third of ten children his parents raised in the New Orleans' Seventh Ward. He attended Grunewald School Of Music after World War II.

== Performing and recording ==
While at Grunewald in 1951 Adolph Smith met Chuck Carbo. Carbo and his brother Leonard "Chick" Carbo were members of the gospel quartet the Delta Southernaires. Smith played guitar with them for a time. New Orleans promoter Phyllis Boone heard Chuck Carbo playing the piano while he was moving her possessions and mentioned them to J&M studio owner Cosimo Matassa. After hearing the Southernaires sing gospel music Matassa suggested they come back and try some rhythm and blues songs. Chuck Carbo enlisted Adolph Smith, a songwriter as well as guitarist and singer, to write two songs. Renamed the Spiders, the group recorded Smith's "I Didn't Want To Do It" reaching #3 on the R&B charts and "You're The One" following at #8. He would write songs and rehearse the Spiders but was not a member and did not appear with them.

Adolph Smith was one of the founding members of the vocal group the Mellow-Drops, a group of friends from the Seventh Ward who first got together in 1952. They played clubs and bars around New Orleans, and were discovered by Imperial Records's Dave Bartholomew. Imperial released "The Crazy Song" b/w "When I Grow Too Old To Dream" in 1954. Having released a record, the Mellow-Drops became the first black group make an appearance on Mel Leavitt's Morning Show on WDSU TV. They also began to play dates outside of New Orleans, including an appearance at a country club in Mobile, Aklabama.

In 1955, for unknown reasons, the group decided to change their name to the Monitors. The met Shirley and Lee, and backed them at a studio session produced by Eddie Mesner owner of Aladdin Records. That session prompted Aladdin to record four songs by the Monitors in 1956, but only the disc "Candy Coated Kisses b/w "Tonight's The Night" with Adolph Smith on lead tenor was released. The songs were written by Smith but credited to his sister Louella Hall. The record did well locally but got little help from Aladdin. In December 1956 the group auditioned for jazz musician and Specialty Records representative Harold Battiste. All three Specialty releases from 1956 through 1958 were popular regionally, but failed to go farther due to lack of support from label owner Art Rupe. Adolph Smith and the Monitors opened at the Dew Drop Inn on June 8, 1956. The Louisiana Weekly from June 9 reported, "The nationally famous Monitors, stars of stage, radio, and television, open this Friday night on the bandstand of Frank Painia's Dew Drop Cafe in a star-studded revue." On October 16, 1956, while waiting at Cosimo Matassa's studio for the rest of the group to arrive Smith, fellow Monitor Billy Tircuit, Issacher "Izzycoo" Gordon of the Spiders, and Art Neville were recruited to sing background vocals on Little Richard's recording of "The Girl Can't Help It". The Monitors' "Rock 'N' Roll Fever" was featured on American Bandstand and given a top-rated 98 on a scale of 35 to 98 in its Rate-A-Record segment. "Rock "N' Roll Fever" was mentioned as the Monitors were noted in The Louisiana Weekly as a "widely acclaimed quartet". Frustrated by their lack of success the Monitors disbanded in 1958. Three years later some former Monitors members including Adolph Smith came back together and renamed themselves The Señors. This group recorded two songs at Cosimo' studio for Sue Records, which left the tilde off the band's name, with Smith's brother Milton "Chateaux" Smith on lead vocals. The group broke up in 1964. From 1961 through 1962 Adolph Smith also recorded with Chuck Cornish as The Two Brothers.

== Songwriting ==
Adolph Smith explained how he wrote his songs, "I hardly ever listened to records or somebody else's music," said Smith, "unless it's gospel or progressive jazz... There was no one (to influence me), because I lived almost a cloistered existence. I was always alone." In 1951 Smith had his first song "Talkative Blues" recorded by New Orleans saxophonist Otis Ducker on Decca."

Smith was not only one of the lead tenors of the Mellow-Drops, but also principal songwriter of the group. Besides writing for the Mellow-Drops, Smith was also drafted to write for Chuck Carbo and the Spiders. Besides the first two hit songs he wrote for the Spiders, he contributed many more. Of the first 24 songs recorded by the Spiders, Adolph wrote 12, including "You're The One", "Walking Around In Circles" and "Sukey, Sukey, Sukey. When the Spiders recorded "Sukey, Sukey, Sukey", it was a retitled version of one of Smith's risqué songs originally titled "Sukey For Your Nookie". "There was nothin' sexual about 'Sukey For Your Nookie,'" Smith said, "It meant just move about and dance, but people said it was suggestive, so we changed that last word." After the Mellow-Drops became the Monitors he remained the group's most prolific songwriter.

Smith got a songwriter mention in Cash Box's R&B Reviews in 1957. At least three songs he wrote were rated in Hit Parader magazine's The Hit Parader Band Wagon of Top Tunes in 1961 and 1962, "For A Thrill", "Never Again", and "You're The One".

Among the performers who recorded Adolph Smith's songs were Freddie King, Hank Crawford, Amos Milburn, Lou Rawls, Sonny Rhodes, Junior Parker, Bobby Mitchell, Little Milton, the O'Jays and UB40.

Adolph Smith died July 31, 2004, in New Orleans, Louisiana.
