= Prince La La =

American singer

Background information
- Born: Lawrence Nelson; 1936; New Orleans, Louisiana, United States
- Died: October 27, 1963 (age 27) New Orleans, Louisiana, U.S.
- Genres: Rhythm and blues
- Occupations: Singer, songwriter
- Instruments: Vocals, guitar
- Years active: 1950s–1963
- Label: A.F.O.

Lawrence Nelson (1936 – October 27, 1963), who recorded as Prince La La, was an American singer, songwriter and guitarist. After a single R&B hit, "She Put the Hurt on Me", he died of a drugs overdose, aged 27.

== Biography ==
He was born in 1936 in the Ninth Ward of New Orleans, Louisiana, United States. His father, Walter Nelson, was a jazz and R&B guitarist, who played with Smiley Lewis. His elder brother, Walter "Papoose" Nelson, played in the 1950s and early 1960s with Fats Domino and Professor Longhair, and was a session guitarist for New Orleans bandlander and producer Dave Bartholomew; he died in 1962. Sister Dorothy was married to the singer, songwriter and producer Jessie Hill.

Nelson started as a songwriter. In 1961, Jessie Hill brought his latest discovery, 19-year-old Barbara George, in for a debut recording session with Harold Battiste's newly founded AFO (All For One) label. Hill proposed that she sing Nelson's song "She Put the Hurt on Me", and played Nelson's vocal demo for her and Battiste to hear. Battiste liked Nelson's version so much he decided to have Nelson sing the song instead. In 1962, it became the first release by the AFO label, b/w "Don’t You Know Little Girl (I'm In Love)". Other musicians on the record included saxophonist Red Tyler and drummer John Boudreaux. Issued in mid-1962, the record was credited to Prince La La – "La La" being Nelson's nickname – and rose to number 28 on the Billboard R&B chart. It was promoted with images of La La in exotic robes, a style later adopted by fellow New Orleans musician Dr. John.

Nelson followed up with a second single at the tail-end of 1962, the Charley Julien song "Gettin' Married Soon", b/w "Come Back To Me". However, in October 1963 he died at the age of 27 in somewhat mysterious circumstances, most sources stating that it was the result of an accidental overdose of heroin, though there have been intimations of foul play.

Nelson's death was the subject of his friend Oliver Morgan's 1964 song "Who Shot the La La?" A further two Prince La La recordings are extant: "Things Have Changed", and a Jessie Hill song, "Need You".
