= Kipori 'Baby Wolf' Woods =

American musician (born 1971)

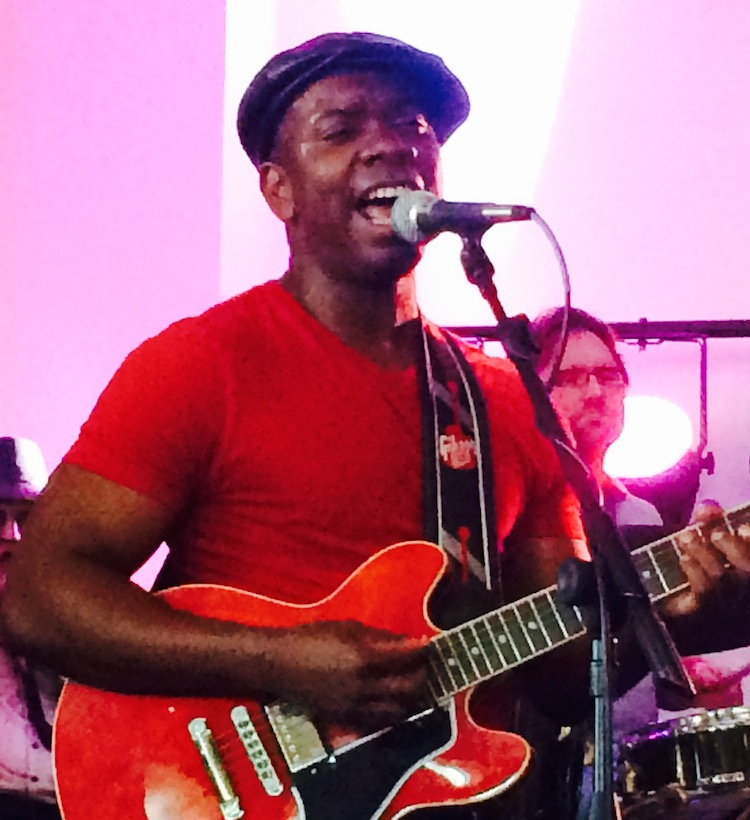
- Woods in Brisbane, Queensland, Australia

Background information
- Born: Kipori Jermaine Woods; September 4, 1971 (age 54); Houston, Texas, U.S.
- Occupations: Actor; singer; songwriter; guitarist

Kipori Jermaine Woods (born September 4, 1971), also known by the stage name Kipori 'Baby Wolf' Woods, is an American actor, singer, songwriter and guitarist raised in New Orleans, Louisiana, United States. He has played gospel, blues, jazz, funk and rap music and plays a blend of these music genres. Woods is the grandson of band-leader and blues bass player 'Luscious' Lloyd Lambert. Woods began singing gospel and playing guitar as a young child, he has played professionally since the 1990s.

== Life and career ==
Born in Houston, Texas, Woods grew up in New Orleans, raised by his grandfather Lloyd Lambert (June 1928 – October 1995). Woods performed with the gospel choirs the Zion Harmonizers and Raymond Miles aged 12. He went on to learn about life as a musician on the road as a young teenager touring with his grandfather, Luscious Lloyd Lambert, bandleader to Ray Charles, Little Richard, Danny Barker, Doc Cheatham and Guitar Slim. In his twenties, Woods played guitar for the first time in his grandfather's band the Rudulph Brothers

He played hip hop/jazz with Kipori Funk and studied jazz at New Orleans University under Ellis Marsalis Jr. He began playing the blues after the death of his grandfather in 1995 and was named 'Baby Wolf' when working with Walter "Wolfman" Washington.

Woods played in the 2004 movie Ray, the 2008 music video "Lately" and in 2007 he toured with the Dirty Dozen Brass Band.

He has toured the Americas, Europe and Japan several times, sharing the stage with artists such as The Neville Brothers, Wynton, Delfeayo and Jason Marsalis, Kermit Ruffins, Walter 'Wolfman' Washington, and Trombone Shorty. Woods has won 'Best Emerging Blues Performer' twice.

In 2012, Wood's album Blues Gone Wild was shortlisted for OffBeat 's Best Blues Album.

== Discography ==
- Bluesman from Down South, Baby Wolf Entertainment, 1999
- Big Black Cadillac, Louisiana Red Hot Records, 2000
- Back in New Orleans, Louisiana Red Hot Records, 2011
- Blues Gone Wild, Louisiana Red Hot Records, 2012
- Jingle Bell Blues, Baby Wolf Records, 2020
- Let's Work Together, Baby Wolf Records, 2021

== Film and television ==
- Bernie Cyress Show
- After Midnight
- Louisiana Jukebox
- Ray
- One Night in Miami...
