= Spanish Grease =

Studio album by Willie Bobo
- Released: 1965
- Recorded: June 8, August 30 and September 8, 1965
- Studio: Van Gelder Studio, Englewood Cliffs, NJ
- Genre: Jazz
- Length: 32:28
- Label: Verve; V6-8631
- Producer: Creed Taylor

Willie Bobo chronology
Let's Go Bobo! (1964)	Spanish Grease (1965)	Uno Dos Tres 1•2•3 (1966)

Spanish Grease is an album by jazz percussionist Willie Bobo recorded in 1965 and released on the Verve label.

== Chart performance ==
The album peaked at No. 137 on the Billboard Top LP's chart in 1966.

== Reception ==
Professional ratings
Review scores
Source	Rating
Allmusic	4/5 stars

The Allmusic review by Richie Unterberger awarded the album 4 stars stating "The timbales player and his band lay down respectable grooves, but "Spanish Grease" is the only original on the album, and by far the most rewarding number".

== Track listing ==
1. "Spanish Grease" (Willie Bobo, Melvin Lastie) – 2:47
2. "Hurt So Bad" (Bobby Hart, Teddy Randazzo, Bobby Weinstein) – 2:39
3. "It's Not Unusual" [vocal version] (Gordon Mills, Les Reed) – 2:20
4. "Our Day Will Come" (Mort Garson, Bob Hilliard) – 2:50
5. "Haitian Lady" (Harold Ousley) – 4:05
6. "Blues in the Closet" (Oscar Pettiford) – 2:11
7. "Nessa" (Ed Diehl) – 4:07
8. "Elation" (Ousley) – 3:49
9. "It's Not Unusual" [instrumental version] (Mills, Reed) – 2:29
10. "Shot Gun/Blind Man, Blind Man" (Junior Walker/Herbie Hancock) – 5:11
- Recorded at Van Gelder Studio in Englewood Cliffs, NJ on June 8 (tracks 1 & 4), August 30 (tracks 5–8) and September 8 (tracks 2, 3, 9 & 10)

== Personnel ==
- Willie Bobo – vocals, percussion, timbales
- Melvin Lastie – cornet
- Bobby Brown – alto saxophone, tenor saxophone
- Clarence "Sonny" Henry – guitar
- Richard Davis, Jim Phillips – bass
- Victor Pantoja – congas

== Charts ==
Chart (1966)	Peak position
US Billboard Top LPs	137
