= Oliver Morgan (singer) =

American singer (1933–2007)

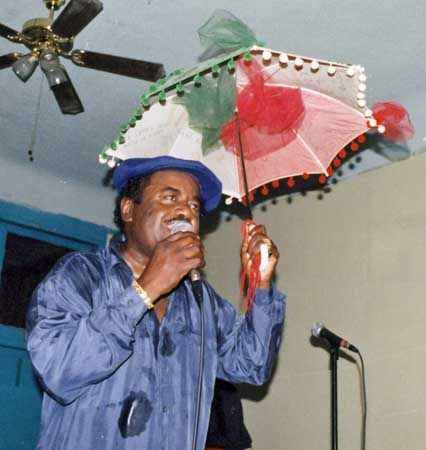
- Morgan on stage with his trademark second-line umbrella, 1996

Background information
- Born: May 6, 1933
- Origin: New Orleans, Louisiana, U.S.
- Died: July 31, 2007 (aged 74)
- Genres: Rhythm and blues
- Occupation: Singer
- Instrument: Vocals
- Years active: 1961–2005

Oliver Morgan (May 6, 1933 – July 31, 2007) was an American R&B singer. A Louisiana Music Hall of Fame inductee, he is best known for his 1964 hit, "Who Shot the La La".

== Life and career ==
Morgan was born and raised in the Lower Ninth Ward of New Orleans, Louisiana, a neighborhood that was also home to Fats Domino, Jesse Hill and Smiley Lewis.

In 1961, he released his debut single on AFO Records under the pseudonym "Nookie Boy." It was in 1964 that he released his only national hit "Who Shot the La La" which sings about the mysterious situation surrounding the death of singer Lawrence "Prince La La" Nelson in 1963. The recording session took place at Cosimo Matassa's studio in New Orleans with Eddie Bo at the piano. Following the success of the song, he went on a tour nationally, but eventually settled as a local singer appearing at local clubs in addition to the New Orleans Jazz Festival. He also had a day job working as a custodian at City Hall and as the caretaker of the New Orleans Pharmacy Museum on Chartres Street.

In 1998, he released his first and only album I'm Home on Allen Toussaint's Nyno label. Toussaint gave him full support providing five of the 10 songs and producing and playing on the album. Morgan's Lower Ninth Ward home was destroyed in the aftermath of Hurricane Katrina, and he evacuated to Atlanta, Georgia with his wife where their children were living. Morgan died from a heart attack in Atlanta on July 31, 2007. He had not performed since he evacuated out of New Orleans.
