= David Lastie =

American musician

Background information
- Born: David Lastie; November 11, 1934; New Orleans, Louisiana
- Died: December 5, 1987 (aged 53) New Orleans, Louisiana
- Genres: Rhythm and blues, Jazz
- Occupations: Saxophonist, bandleader, composer
- Years active: c.1952 – 1987

David Lastie, Sr. (November 11, 1934- December 5, 1987) was an American jazz and rhythm & blues saxophonist, bandleader, and composer from the musical Lastie family who played and recorded for more than thirty years.

During his career Lastie was featured on many R&B recordings for artists such as Guitar Slim, Sugarboy Crawford, Eddie Bo, Jessie Hill, James Booker, Dr. John, Earl King, Snooks Eaglin, and Huey "Piano" Smith.

== Young life and musical education ==
David Lastie was born in New Orleans, Louisiana and grew up in the lower 9th Ward of the city. His parents Frank and Alice Hill Lastie raised six children- Chester, Melvin, David, Joseph, Walter, and Betty Ann. Frank Lastie was a disciple of faith healer Mother Catherine Seals, who had brass musicians in her services in the Spiritual church and was a trombonist herself. Seals persuaded Deacon Lastie to play drums in church. He went on to teach his sons Melvin, David, and Walter to play music in church. Daughter Betty Ann became a gospel singer, following in the family musical tradition. David Lastie later recalled, "Oh yeah, you had to go to church if you wanted to stay in my house. All our background history of music comes from the church." As a young man he became interested in the saxophone. His older brother Melvin met sax player Ornette Coleman on a job in Natchez, Mississippi, and invited him to move in with the Lastie family in New Orleans. Coleman and Melvin practiced together. "I went to church with him and his father, and I took the alto, David's horn, and I played there every Sunday," Coleman recalled. He lived with the Lastie family for close to a year. David learned fingerings on the sax from Leroy Sergion, an alto player in Melvin's and Roy Brown's band. He sketched out the sax keys on a piece of board and would play along with his brother and Sergion. He also took lessons from Buddy Hagan, who played in Fats Domino's band. He was a fan of popular saxophonists like Louis Jordan, Jimmy Forrest, and Jimmy Liggins. At age 15 he was making deliveries for a retail drug establishment.

== Career ==
In the early 1950s Lastie joined the House Rockers, started by his uncle Jessie Hill who played the drums. The group played R&B music in neighborhood clubs, as well as in hillbilly bars in St. Bernard Parish In 1952 Gulf Coast promoter Percy Stovall put together a band with Lastie on tenor sax, Eddie Lang (born Eddie Lee Langlois) on guitar, and Huey "Piano" Smith on piano to back guitarist/ singer Guitar Slim on a tour of the South. They recorded two sides in Nashville for Jim Bulleit's (of Bullet Records) J-B label, "Certainly All" b/w "Feelin’ Sad". By 1953 Lastie was back in New Orleans. He joined Cha-Paka-Shaweez, a musical ensemble which featured James "Sugar Boy" Crawford on piano and vocals. The group was formed in 1950 at Booker T. Washington High School, and had previously recorded for Aladdin Records. Leonard Chess of Chess heard them rehearsing at a local radio station, and they recorded a series of sides for Chess subsidiary Checker Records in 1953 and 1954. Chess changed the name of the band, still under contract to Aladdin, to Sugarboy and the Cane Cutters. The records sold well locally but failed to reach the national charts. One song, "Jock-A-Mo", became a Carnival perennial in New Orleans. Lastie later said of his time with Sugarboy, "We had a hell of a band. Sugar Boy loved to play. Man when I was hooked up with Sugar Boy, we were working five, sometimes six nights a week." In 1965 New Orleans girl group The Dixie Cups reached No. 20 on the U.S. Billboard chart with the song under the name "Iko Iko". Since then numerous versions have been released in the U.S. and abroad. Lastie left Sugarboy and the Cane Cutters to form the first Lastie Brothers combo with his brother Melvin. Also in that band were Reveal Thomas on piano, Lawrence Guyton on guitar, and Jessie Hill on drums. The band went on tour in 1954 with R&B singers Smiley Lewis and Big Joe Turner. Lastie remembered, "I wrecked the band’s car after my first night in Tijuana. I lost the car and most of my money to the Mexican police, so we had to ride in Smiley’s car 'Lillie Mae'." After that trip he went back on the road with Sugarboy Crawford and Papa Lightfoot. The Lastie Brothers band reformed to play at the Caffin Theater in New Orleans with a new member, pianist "Spider" Bocage, later known as Eddie Bo. Bo soon recorded "I'm Wise" (later covered as "Slippin' and Slidin'") and "Hey Bo" on Apollo Records, after which he was signed by the Shaw Booking Agency. He organized a band with himself on piano, David Lastie and Robert Parker on saxes, Walter "Popee" Lastie on drums, and Irving Banister on guitar. They toured the United States backing Ruth Brown, Big Joe Turner, Amos Milburn, and Charles Brown, Faye Adams, The Drifters, The Clovers, Jerry Butler, and others. Irving Banister considered Eddie Bo's band of this era to be one of the best to come out of New Orleans. By the late 1950s Jessie Hill put together a new version of the House Rockers with himself on vocals and tambourine, David Lastie on sax, Alvin "Shine" Robinson on guitar, Richard Payne on bass, and John Boudreaux on drums.

== Recordings ==
One of the House Rockers' regular gigs was at Shy Guy's Place in the Ninth Ward. David Lastie recalled that a blues pianist called "Big Four", who played for wine and tips, gave the words to "Ooh Poo Pah Doo" to Jessie Hill. He copied the words on a paper bag and added a call and response intro he'd heard at bandleader Dave Bartholomew's show. He brought a tape of the song to a Minit Records open audition. Owner Joe Banashak liked what he heard and signed Hill. Also signed that day were Ernie K-Doe, Aaron Neville, Allen Toussaint, and Benny Spellman. Banashak sent Hill and the House Rockers to Cosimo Matassa's studio to record "Ooh Poo Pah Doo" Part 1 b/w "Ooh Poo Pah Doo" Part 2. Allen Toussaint played piano and also produced the song, his first as a producer. The song was a big hit in New Orleans. When it was released in February 1960 it was Part 2, an instrumental featuring David Lastie on booting sax, that hit the national charts, reaching No. 3 on the R&B and No. 28 on the Billboard pop chart. Lastie became a sought after session musician on many recordings at Cosimo Matassa's studio in the 1960s, including playing on many of Allen Toussaint's productions for Minit and Instant Records. He recorded Chess Records single #1800 in 1961 under his own name which featured the songs "Jack The Ripper Part 1" by the Tip Tops b/w "Jack The Ripper Part 2" by David Lastie And His Rippers. He briefly moved to California in the mid-1960s with several other New Orleans musicians seeking better musical opportunities. While there he played on Dr. John's "Gumbo" album. On his return to New Orleans he organized A Taste Of New Orleans, a band featuring his sister Betty Ann and brother Walter. They recorded "A New Taste Of New Orleans" in 1977. Lastie recorded with the French Market Jazz Hall Band playing traditional jazz. The group recorded two albums for Shalom Records- "Jazz With Desire" and "A Buggy Full of Jazz". He also recorded "Direct From New Orleans" with another similarly named trad jazz group, the French Market Jazz Band, that had some of the same personnel.

== Jazzman ==
Beginning in the 1950s and continuing throughout his life, Lastie performed jazz in various settings. In 1957 Melvin and David Lastie, playing modern jazz as the Lastie Brothers, opened at the High Hat Club. Singer Al Reed worked with the Lastie Brothers band for nearly a year and recalled gigs they played at the High Hat and the Old Gypsy Tea Room during this time. In the latter 1950s Lastie was among the musicians, including Smokey Johnson, who would gather after their gigs to jam at the Hollis club off Claiborne Avenue from 2:00 A.M. until sunrise. All the while Lastie continued to play modern jazz gigs around New Orleans. As noted in New Orleans magazine in 1969, his modern jazz outfit played after hours weekend sessions at the Off Limits club. He also played in the 1960s with bassist George French, son of Albert "Papa" French, and pianist Emile Vinette at such venues as Sam & Kay's in the 9th Ward and Crazy Shirley's on Bourbon Street. Lastie toured in Europe in the 1980s, backing Snooks Eaglin, Johnny Adams, Earl King, and others. In lean times he sometimes drove a produce truck to support his family.

== Bandleader and influence ==
At various times bassist George Porter, Jr., guitarist Walter "Wolfman" Washington, singer Wanda Rouzan, and drummer Shannon Powell were members of Lastie's A Taste Of New Orleans band. When asked to name an artist who helped guide his musical career, guitarist/singer Walter "Wolfman" Washington remembered David Lastie as someone who helped him through life. Pianist David Torkanowsky said David Lastie was a griot who "adopted" him as a young musician, taking him around and offering him a sort of legitimacy. Dr. John learned about gris gris as a young teenager from David Lastie. He later said," By hanging around his family, especially with his mother, I copped a lot of understanding about the gris-gris and the spiritual church.” George Porter, Jr. told of being schooled with valuable advice by David Lastie. "He told me what not to do instead of what to do," Porter said with a laugh. Saxophonist/ clarinetist Victor Goines said Lastie "was a great tenor player." Musician and arranger Harold Battiste said, "David's soulful tenor sax sound brought him acclaim and respect from his musician and artist peers, and his warm jovial spirit, was always present in his performances." According to jazz banjoist Danny Barker, "He was one of the great tenor players in the elements of New Orleans music."

David Lastie died in New Orleans on December 5, 1987, at age 53. A traditional jazz funeral was held for him at the Divine Spiritual Church. Lastie's body was accompanied by mournful dirges as it was taken from the church, then the band broke into a raucous upbeat song as the musicians "cut him loose."
