= Uno Dos Tres 1-2-3 =

Studio album by Willie Bobo
- Released: 1966
- Recorded: January 26 and April 25 & 26, 1966
- Studios: Van Gelder Studio, Englewood Cliffs, NJ
- Genre: Jazz
- Length: 32:28
- Labels: Verve; V6-8648
- Producer: Creed Taylor

Willie Bobo chronology
Spanish Grease (1965)	Uno Dos Tres 1-2-3 (1966)	Feelin' So Good (1966)

Uno Dos Tres 1-2-3 is an album by jazz percussionist Willie Bobo recorded in 1966 and released on the Verve label.

== Reception ==
Professional ratings
Review scores
Source	Rating
AllMusic	3/5 stars

The AllMusic review by Richie Unterberger awarded the album 3 stars, stating "As with his previous album Spanish Grease, the toughest and most memorable track is the one Bobo original, 'Fried Neck Bones and Some Homefries.' Its creeping Latin soul groove was, like 'Spanish Grease,' an obvious inspiration for Carlos Santana".

== Track listing ==
1. "Boogaloo in Room 802" (John Hart, Melvin Lastie) - 2:35
2. "Come a Little Bit Closer" (Tommy Boyce, Bobby Hart, Wes Farrell) - 2:28
3. "Goin' Out of My Head" (Teddy Randazzo, Bobby Weinstein) - 3:26
4. "I Remember Clifford" (Benny Golson) - 2:04
5. "Rescue Me" (Raynard Miner, Carl Smith) - 3:08
6. "Michelle" (John Lennon, Paul McCartney) - 3:16
7. "No Matter What Shape (Your Stomach's In)" (Granville Burland) - 2:43
8. "Fried Neck Bones and Some Homefries" (Willie Bobo, Melvin Lastie) - 3:01
9. "Ol' Man River" (Oscar Hammerstein II, Jerome Kern) - 3:11
10. "One, Two, Three (Uno, Dos, Tres)" (Len Barry, John Medora, David White) - 2:38
11. "Night Song" (Lee Adams, Charles Strouse) - 2:43
12. "The Breeze and I" (Ernesto Lecuona) - 3:16
- Recorded at Van Gelder Studio on January 26 (tracks 8 & 10), April 25 (tracks 2 & 5–7), and April 26 (tracks 1, 3, 4, 6, 9, 11 & 12), 1966

== Personnel ==
- Willie Bobo – timbales
- Melvin Lastie – cornet
- Bobby Brown – alto saxophone, tenor saxophone
- Clarence "Sonny" Henry – guitar
- John Hart, Bobby Rodriguez – bass
- Carlos "Patato" Valdes – congas
- Osvaldo Martinez – bongos, guiro
- Jose Mangual, Victor Pantoja – percussion
- Chico O'Farrill - arranger
