= Witchcraft (1955 song) =

Song by The Spiders
- Released: 1955
- Genre: R&B
- Label: Imperial
- Songwriters: Dave Bartholomew and Pearl King

Witchcraft is a song composed by Dave Bartholomew and Pearl King which was an R&B hit in 1955 for the Spiders. It was later recorded by Elvis Presley.

== The Spiders' version ==
The Spiders' version of the song was released by Imperial Records and reached No. 5 on the Most Played by Jockeys chart.

== Elvis Presley's version ==
"Witchcraft" was covered in 1963 by Elvis Presley. Presley's version was released in 1963 as the B-side to "Bossa Nova Baby" and on its own reached No. 32 on the pop charts.
