= AFO Records =

American record label

- Founded: 1961
- Founder: Harold Battiste
- Status: Defunct
- Distributor: Sue Records
- Country of origin: U.S.
- Location: New Orleans, Louisiana

All for One Records, better known as AFO, was an African American musician-owned record label. AFO was founded in New Orleans in 1961 by Harold Battiste, who was an established composer, arranger, and performer. AFO was established as a musicians' collective. According to AFO alumnus Wallace Johnson, Battiste "said it was time for New Orleans musicians that make the music to make the money – not out-of-town companies that came here to record." House musicians for AFO included Harold Battiste, Red Tyler, Roy Montrell, Peter Badie, John Boudreaux and Melvin Lastie. AFO was distributed by Sue Records.

In 1961, AFO released Barbara George's song "I Know (You Don't Love Me No More)", which reached the top of the R&B chart and #3 on the Hot 100 chart.

In 1963, Battiste and other members of the collective moved to Los Angeles, in hopes of greater success. Battiste's band, the AFO Executives, became a backup band for Sam Cooke and other SAR Records artists until Cooke's death in 1964. The collective soon diffused, and AFO went on "extended hiatus".

In 1991, Battiste, who had returned to New Orleans, restarted the project and leased much of the AFO catalog to Ace Records, who used them to produce a series of compilations beginning with Gumbo Stew.

By 2007, Battiste created the AFO Foundation to protect and nurture the resources of AFO Records and Battiste's music publishing company, At Last Publishing.

== Compilations ==
- Gumbo Stew (Original A.F.O. New Orleans R&B) (Ace CDCHD-450, 1993)
- More Gumbo Stew (More A.F.O. New Orleans R&B) (Ace CDCHD-462, 1993)
- Still Spicy Gumbo Stew (Original A.F.O. New Orleans R&B) (Ace CDCHD-520, 1994)
