= Walter "Popee" Lastie =

American musician

Background information
- Also known as: Popee
- Born: Walter Daniel Lastie; September 18, 1938; New Orleans, Louisiana, U.S.
- Died: December 28, 1980 (aged 42) New Orleans, Louisiana, U.S.
- Genres: Rhythm and blues, Jazz
- Occupation: Drummer
- Years active: c.1954–1980

Walter Daniel Lastie (September 18, 1938 – December 28, 1980), also known as "Popee", was an American rhythm & blues and jazz drummer from the musical Lastie family who played and recorded with many of New Orleans' leading R&B musicians.

Walter Lastie, was born September 18, 1938, in New Orleans to Frank and Alice Hill Lastie. Walter's five siblings were brothers Chester, Melvin, David, and Joseph, and sister Betty Ann. The family lived in the lower 9th Ward of New Orleans. Frank Lastie had been sent to the Colored Waifs Home for boys as a youth. "One of his first engagements was in the Waif's home with Louis Armstrong," according to drummer Herlin Riley, Lastie's grandson. Riley said the boys received their first musical training at the juvenile detention school. In the 1920s Frank Lastie became a disciple of Mother Catherine Seals, a trombone-playing leader of the Spiritual movement. She and other Black Spiritualist preachers encouraged their congregations to follow Psalm 98 and "Make a joyful noise unto the Lord". At Mother Catherine Seal's request, Deacon Frank Lastie introduced drums into her Spiritual Church rituals in the late 1920s. Lastie played regularly in church, and taught his children music there. Four of his children subsequently became professional musicians. Melvin played trumpet, David played saxophone, Walter played drums, and Betty Ann became a gospel singer.

== Early life and education ==
Walter's father taught him the rudiments of drumming as a child. He recalled, "My father had a very rare style of playing. He played mostly with his fingers. He would use the tips of his fingers rather than his wrists to move the sticks. It's supposed to be something new and he been doin' it ever since I can remember." Before reaching his teens Walter had lessons from Fat Domino's drummer. "Every month they would have a children's hour at the Hot Spot, that's where Fats used to play, and his drummer, Cornelius Coleman, would stand behind me with his hands on my shoulders. He was left-handed and he'd cross his hands and play the beats on me and if I played it wrong he would slap me! So, I had to learn that way." Walter's parents Frank and Alice opened their house to young musicians who practiced with their children, including Alice's brother Jessie Hill and Melvin's friend Ornette Coleman. Walter attended Joseph S. Clark Sr. High School, where he studied with influential teacher Yvonne Busch. Busch was a graduate of Southern University, who had toured with the International Sweethearts of Rhythm as a trumpeter. She also played trombone and drums. Among her students were drummers Smokey Johnson, John Boudreaux, and James Black. Herlin Riley, son of Betty Ann Lastie, said that when he was growing up his uncle Walter Lastie rehearsed at his house with his friend Smokey Johnson.

== Career ==
Lastie's first job was when he went on the road with the Freddie Domino band when he was sixteen years old in 1954. Domino, a trumpeter and vocalist, was Fats Domino's first cousin. Walter remembered, "It was a real good experience for me and a whole lot of other guys who came up during the time I was coming up because Freddie hired all young people. He is the cause of a lot of musicians my age getting their start." Beginning in 1955 Lastie toured with New Orleans piano player Eddie Bo, at that time going by name Spider Bocage, and his band, including David Lastie on saxophone and Irving Banister on guitar, organized for the Shaw Booking Agency. They backed such artists as Little Willie John, Amos Milburn, Etta James, Ruth Brown, the Platters, and Big Mama Thornton until 1964. Another Eddie Bo band- James Rivers and Robert Parker on tenor sax, Porgy Jones on trumpet, Joe Morrison on guitar, Placide Adams on bass, and Walter Lastie on drums- played on the first hits by Irma Thomas ("Don't Mess with My Man") and Robert Parker ("All Nite Long"), and a Mardi Gras classic by Al Johnson ("Carnival Time"). The band also played on Eddie Bo's funky 1960 recordings, including "Tell It Like It Is" with Walter Lastie's parade rhythms and "Every Dog Got His Day" powered by Lastie's driving beats.

Walter Lastie was known as one of New Orleans' most accomplished drummers. He was a mainstay drummer for many jazz and R&B groups. On one gig at the Club Tiajuana Lastie said he thought he was the only sighted musician performing in an all-blind band until one night when a fight broke out. In the midst of the melee, one of the "blind" band members shouted at him, "Watch it, Popee, here comes a Regal Beer bottle at you." During his career Lastie played drums for acts as varied as snake dancers and New Orleans R&B masters Professor Longhair and Dr. John, among others.

In 1973 Walter Lastie replaced Tenoo Coleman on Fats Domino's European tour. He spent time as Fats Domino's drummer and road manager for the band. Walter's nephew, drummer Joseph Lastie, Jr. recollected, "My uncle Walter used to work with Fats Domino and go out on the road and make like $600 in a week, and I thought that was a lot of money. They met some racial profiling, too. They paid their dues so we can be where we're at today as musicians." Walter played on Fats Domino's "Hello Josephine: Live At Montreux" album, recorded on that tour in 1973.

The French Market Jazz Hall Band, a traditional jazz outfit featuring David Lastie on tenor sax, Clarence Ford on tenor sax and clarinet, Waldren "Frog" Joseph on trombone, Placide Adams on bass, Richard Fleming on trumpet, Neal Unterseher on banjo, Betty Ann (Lastie) Williams on vocals, and Walter Lastie on drums, performed and recorded traditional jazz in the 1970s. The two Lastie brothers also played and recorded with the French Market Jazz Band, a different group of musicians.

Beginning in 1977 the Lastie brothers' band "A Taste of New Orleans" performed around New Orleans and abroad. Spotlighted in the band were Walter on drums, brother David on sax, and sister Betty Ann, who made appearances on gospel piano and as an R&B vocalist. Walter had often played with David and Betty Ann in services at their father's Guiding Star Church.

In 1979 the Lastie Brothers band featuring David Lastie on tenor sax, Walter Lastie on drums, George French on bass, and Walter "Wolfman" Washington on guitar backed Huey "Piano" Smith's historic New Orleans Jazz & Heritage Festival reunion with former Clowns Bobby Marchan, Gerri Hall, Roosevelt Wright, and Curley Moore. "Their performance was superb, like a dream come true, with strong support from the Lastie Brothers band", reported writer Clive Richardson in England's Juke Blues.

== Influence ==
Herlin Riley grew up hearing his uncles Melvin, David, and Walter rehearse at his grandmother's house. "They would play Fats Domino R&B stuff, and then they would play something like 'Moanin' ' by Art Blakey and the Jazz Messengers. So I heard those two styles and my grandfather (Deacon Frank Lastie) was playing the earlier stuff. It was never a big deal going from one idiom to the other." Riley elaborated on the influence of his mentor, "That's something I got from my uncle Walter 'Popee' Lastie. Whenever he would sit down and tell me about playing the drums, he would always say, 'Whenever you play a solo think about the melody and try to play the form of the tune so that people can relate to it.' As opposed to playing just a beat or playing a lot of wild licks. Whatever I play I try to make it musically coherent." Walter showed nephew Joe Lastie how to refine the drumming technique his grandfather played in church. The younger Lastie, later a drummer with the Preservation Hall jazz band and leader of his own ensemble, found his family's legacy taught him that a life in music was possible.

== Personal life ==
Walter Lastie and his wife Sarah bought a house in the lower 9th Ward in 1972. The couple had two daughters. Lastie died of a heart attack at age 42 on December 28, 1980, as he and his band played "When The Saints Go Marching In" at Jackson Square in New Orleans. Walter Lastie's life was celebrated with a jazz funeral. Musicians from the Olympia, Tuxedo and other bands participated. As one said, "Ain't many cats could draw this many of us out - on a Saturday morning, to boot."
