= June Gardner =

American musician

Albert "June" Gardner

Background information
- Also known as: Gentleman June
- Born: Albert Gardner; December 31, 1930; New Orleans, Louisiana, U.S.
- Died: November 19, 2010 (aged 79) New Orleans, Louisiana, U.S.
- Genres: Rhythm and Blues, Jazz
- Occupations: Drummer, Bandleader
- Years active: c.1940s - 2010
- Labels: Hot Line Records, Blue Rock Records, EmArcy Records, Hep' Me Records, Night Train International Records, Friends of WWOZ, Inc.

Albert "June" Gardner (December 31, 1930 – November 19, 2010) was an American R&B and jazz drummer and bandleader from New Orleans whose professional music career spanned six decades.

== Early life ==
Albert Samuel Gardner, Jr. was born in New Orleans, Louisiana to Albert, Sr. and Olivia Woodland Gardner, the youngest of their six children. He was nicknamed June, short for Junior. His brothers were Tom and Richard, his sisters Myrtle, Thelma, and Cleo. Gardner said his father was from McComb, Mississippi and his mother was from "across the river", meaning the west bank of the Mississippi. They lived at 2909 LaSalle Street. When he was a young boy the family moved to 2620 St. Andrew Street, between Magnolia and Robertson streets, into a house with no electricity and an outdoor privy. His father worked for the Illinois Central railroad. The family attended the First Evangelist Missionary Baptist at Felicity and Willow Streets. By the time of a 1996 interview Gardner admitted he was no longer religious, but said, "I carry the Lord in my chest twenty-four hours a day".

As a child, Gardner was aware of the celebrations taking place in his neighborhood on New Year's Eve (his birthday), "I thought it was all for me", he remembered. "None of my family was in music", he said. After the family home got electricity they obtained a record player. Gardner remembered hearing Doctor Clayton and big band records. "We always had a piano and different musicians would come by and play", including Tuts Washington and Papa Yellow. Champion Jack Dupree was a friend of the family's and would play when he stayed with them on his visits to New Orleans.

Gardner followed parades in his neighborhood as a child. "Everything passed on Magnolia (Street)", he said, including Mardi Gras Indians. "I could feel Paul Barbarin or Freddie Kohlman" coming in a parade, even before he began playing drums. Drummer Ed Blackwell agreed, "New Orleans has this heritage of marching and parading. All of the drummers that are born there come up hearing that everyday.". Gardner would also go to vaudeville theaters, the Ritz and the Palace, to hear drummer Pickle Johnson. In 1944 when Gardner became interested in playing drums his parents paid for lessons with Professor Valmont Victor. "Twenty-five cents (a lesson) was a lot of money at the time, but they made arrangements for me to do it", he recalled. He also took music classes when at Booker T. Washington High School, and played in the school’s marching band. His parents could not afford to buy him drums, but the school had them for their students. He said, "The earlier you’d get to school (you) had the best chance of getting a better drum." His older brother Richard bought him his first drum set.

During his childhood Gardner heard the blues around his neighborhood. "We lived across the street from some juke joints, all night long they played the blues." He recalled hearing Blue Lu Barker, Alma Parnell, and T-Bone Walker among others. He started playing at the Groove Room, a club within the Dew Drop Inn, at age fifteen. Both clubs were owned by Frank Painia. Gardner said Painia told him, when he complained to him about his pay, "You learning on my stage so I'm not gonna pay you as much as the other guys." The band consisted of Edgar Blanchard (guitar), Stuart Davis (bass), Arthur Blackwell, (piano), and Gardner (drums). Gardner admitted, "I was scared to death playing”, but "it was a great learning experience for me". He was soon playing six nights a week, and made a decision to quit school for the life of a musician.

Gardner pointed out local drummers Weedy Morris (Idris Muhammad nee Leo Morris's brother), Earl Palmer, Tenoo Coleman, and Ed Blackwell as influences, as well as Texas-born jazz drummer Wilbert Hogan.

== Career ==
Gardner left the Dew Drop to go with Jay Johnson's band, then playing at the Rhythm Club, later called Club Rocket, at Jackson Avenue and Derbigny Street. The band, including saxophonist August "Dimes" Dupont, opened for such acts as Andy Kirk, Luis Russell, Lucky Millinder, and Erskine Hawkins.

In 1947 he joined Edgar Blanchard's Gondoliers, with Blanchard on guitar and Gardner on drums, at Percy Stovall's Pelican Club on Rampart Street. The venue was an early attempt to create a nightclub on Rampart Street to rival the Dew Drop Inn on Lasalle St.

From 1949-1950 Gardner played with saxophonist and bandleader Otis Drucker at the Dew Drop Inn. Drucker said, "When I was at the Dew Drop, I used only four pieces: that was 'Carter' playing bass, June Gardner playing drums, Reveal Thomas was on piano, I was on alto saxophone." Gardner left the Gondoliers to go on the road with singer Roy Brown’s band The Mighty Men.

Gardner was drafted into the Army in 1951. He did his basic training in Texas, and was sent to an infantry unit in Fairbanks, Alaska. There he auditioned for a service band, and spent the rest of his enlistment drumming for the Army in bands that included Louisiana sax man Plas Johnson.

Gardner was discharged in 1953 and returned to New Orleans. He went back on the road with Roy Brown's Mighty Men until 1955. Back in New Orleans he played in various bands, sometimes as bandleader, often with his friends Red Tyler and Chuck Badie. He worked at black bars including the Shadowland, the Nite Cap, the Haven, Big Time Crips, the Joy Tavern, and the Forest Inn, as many as nine jobs a week.

In 1956 Chuck Badie recommended Gardner to Lionel Hampton to replace Rufus Jones, after an October 2, 1955 bus accident that killed or injured some members of Hampton’s band. The six-month tour included dates in Europe and Israel, along with a live recording from the Olympia in Paris. Hampton's band recorded the Jazz Flamenco album in Madrid. A Down Beat reviewer wrote that the diplomatic importance of Hampton's tour and recording undoubtedly exceeded the value of the music itself. The band played Cafe Society in New York City, backing guest star Louis Armstrong on "When It's Sleepy Time Down South".

Following the Hampton tour, Gardner's friend David "Fathead" Newman recruited him for six weeks on the road playing behind Ray Charles. Gardner said he left because "the money was funny", and claimed Charles still owed him 40 dollars.

"When Earl Palmer left town in 1957 I took his place with Earl Williams at the Dream Room on Bourbon Street", Gardner remembered. The Dream Room was a whites-only venue, where black musicians were not allowed on the club's floor. The bandstand was also segregated. "On Bourbon Street you (black and white musicians) couldn't play together", Gardner said. The only black people allowed on Bourbon Street at the time were workers. Black musicians were considered hired help; some had to wait in storerooms between sets. After the passage of civil rights legislation some club owners resisted integration, and audiences on Bourbon Street were mostly white for years afterward. Studio work had no such limitations. Gardner was one of several drummers competing for the first call position at Cosimo recording studio on Governor Nicholls Street after Palmer's departure. He said of that time, "They took advantage of my youth and inexperience".

New Orleans-born drummer Idris Muhammad recalled, "My first trip to New York was with Sam Cooke. That was just an eye opener. We were workin' from the South, all the way up. We played the Apollo Theater and then we went on. I came back to New Orleans. There was some kind of mix-up with Sam and the guitarist that played with Sam, and another drummer named June Gardner, from New Orleans. The guitarist wanted an older guy to play with him. But Sam hired me, so he couldn't do anything about it. So, he called June Gardner and offered him the gig. June took the gig, and told me I could have his gig in town. So I took his gig in town and he went out on the road with Sam." Cooke knew Gardner had come up through the New Orleans apprentice system. He had a driving rock-steady beat. He joined Cooke and his guitarist Cliff White in Richmond, Virginia. Gardner remembered, "We'd come into town, and have a rehearsal, and one of Cliff's famous lines was, 'If you don't play my music right, I'm gonna snatch your arm out and beat you with the bloody end!'" Gardner quickly learned to keep the rhythm the way Cliff wanted it. The two traveled as Cooke’s band. The common practice at the time was to use the house musicians in each town to supplement. Gardner recalled fondly the times when Sam would turn to Cliff in the middle of a song and say, "Tell them fuckers to lay out!" Then the other musicians would stop playing, and Sam would sing with just White and Gardner backing him. "We killed them", Gardner said, "with just guitar and drums". He added that Cooke kept him and Cliff White on salary when not on the road, with "a check every week".

Sam Cooke's Live at the Harlem Square Club, 1963 LP was recorded in Miami. Writer Bruce Eder said, "This is the real Sam Cooke, doing a sweaty, raspy, soulful set at the Harlem Square Club in North Miaimi, Florida, on January 12, 1963, backed by King Curtis and his band, a handful of local musicians, and Cooke's resident sidemen, guitarist Cliff White and drummer Albert 'June' Gardner. To put it simply, it's one of the greatest soul records ever cut by anybody, outshining James Brown's Live at the Apollo and easily outclassing Jackie Wilson's live record from the Copa."

After Sam Cooke’s untimely death in 1964, Gardner went on the road with Cooke cohort Lou Rawls for a month. He left due to "problems with the money". Back in New Orleans he led bands on Bourbon Street and did numerous studio sessions. He played on Allen Toussaint's production of Lee Dorsey's "Working in the Coal Mine". The Amy Records release entered the U.S. Billboard Hot 100 on July 23, 1966, and peaked at number eight, while reaching number five on the Billboard Hot R&B chart. It also reached number eight on the UK singles chart. Gardner was also the drummer on Aaron Neville's "Tell it Like It Is", which peaked at number two on the Billboard Hot 100 and number one on the Billboard Hot R&B chart.

In the 1970s, Gardner led a traditional jazz band at the Famous Door on Bourbon Street. After that he joined trumpeter Wallace Davenport at the Paddock Lounge, also on Bourbon Street, and appeared regularly at Preservation Hall. Gardner, with his band The Fellas, made annual dates at the New Orleans Jazz and Heritage Festival, capping a career that began in the 1940s.

== Recordings ==
New Orleans record label Hot Line released "99 Plus 1" b/w "Mustard Greens" by J. Gardner in 1965. The disc received local airplay and stirred up enough interest to be picked up by Blue Rock Records, a subsidiary of Mercury Records. Gardner's next single "It's Gonna Rain" b/w "Last Night", acquired little notice. Mercury released Bustin' Out, an LP which collected Gardner's singles output and more, on EmArcy Records. The tracks were produced by Wardell Quezergue, known as the "Creole Beethoven", who also wrote four of the songs. The album bore the name Gentleman June Gardner. It failed to chart. In 1970 Gardner recorded "Tennessee Waltz" b/w "The Jolly Little Meget" on Hep-Me Records for producer Senator Jones. In 2000 Night Train International put out June Gardner 99 Plus One: Rare & Unreissued Jazzy Soul & Funk, a compilation album of Gardner's EmArcy and Hep-Me recordings.

June Gardner and the Fellas played the Economy Hall Tent at the New Orleans Jazz and Heritage Festival using musicians including bassist Chuck Badie, Gardner on drums, pianist Thaddeus Richard, trumpeter Leroy Jones, and trombonist Lucien Barbarin. Barbarin had played rhythm and blues gigs around New Orleans, but an invitation to work with Gardner at Preservation Hall drew Barbarin toward traditional jazz. His uncle Paul Barbarin, who Gardner heard as a child, was recruited by Louis Armstrong for his big band in the 1930s. A live recording of "Tin Roof Blues" by June Gardner and the Fellas from the 2001 New Orleans Jazz and Heritage Festival was featured on radio station WWOZ's compilation CD Sounds of New Orleans 2002 release. It was released again on the 2011 WWOZ compilation CD Play It Again.

== Personal life ==
For a time Gardner had a drum studio where he instructed students because, he said, "As long as there's New Orleans there will be drummers". He had learned by imitating other drummers. "What you playing somebody else done played, you just added a little bit to it". After hearing other drummers, Gardner said he would "add my little onions and garlic to it". He stressed getting the bass drum going first—1, 2, 3, 4, then add the high hat on 2 and 4. "You have to know where 1 is at" with the bass drum. "Learn your timing", he advised, "everything else comes in". Gardner placed emphasis on practicing. "Everybody can mess up but the drummer - piano or sax hit a wrong note nobody say nothing. Drummer does it he throws off the dancers and the whole band". Gardner tuned his drums to his own ear, though he acknowledged, "Everybody tunes their drums different. After a while they become seasoned". Gardner told young drummers it was important that their families understood the demands of a musician's life. As a local bandleader, he would encourage jittery younger players by telling them, "Hit 'em hard and wish 'em well".

Albert "June" Gardner died on November 19, 2010. He and wife Rachel were the parents of four boys and one girl, seven grandchildren and eleven great grandchildren. "He was right on the ball", said drummer Smokey Johnson, who had been friends with Gardner since he was 17 years old. "If he couldn't do it right, he wouldn't do it at all. He was a special dude and just like his record says, he was 'Gentlemen June Gardner'".

== Discography ==
=== Singles ===
- "99 Plus 1" b/w "Mustard Greens" – (as June Gardner) Hot Line Records 118 (1965), (as J. Gardner) Blue Rock Records B4026 (1965)
- "It's Gonna Rain" b/w "Last Night" – (as Gentleman June Gardner) Blue Rock Records B4050 (1966), EmArcy Records E4050 (1966)
- "Bustin' Out" – (as Gentleman June Gardner) EmArcy Records LP MGE26014 (mono), SRE66014 (stereo) (1966)
- "Tennessee Waltz" b/w "The Jolly Little Meget" – (as Gentleman June Gardner) Hep' Me Records 105 (1971)

=== Albums ===
- 99 Plus One: Rare & Unissued Jazzy Soul & Funk 1965- 1970 – (as June Gardner) Night Train International NTI LP 7103 (1999), Night Train International NTI CD 7103 (2000)
- Tin Roof Blues – (as June Gardner and the Fellows) Friends of WWOZ CD The Sounds of New Orleans Vol.17 (2002), Friends of WWOZ CD Play It Again Vol.34 (2011)
