= Chuck Carbo =

American singer (1926–2008)

Hayward "Chuck" Carbo

Background information
- Born: January 11, 1926; Houma, Louisiana, US
- Died: July 11, 2008 (aged 82) New Orleans, Louisiana, US
- Genres: Gospel, Rhythm & Blues
- Occupation: singer
- Years active: 1950s–2000s
- Labels: Imperial Records, Ace Records (United States), Rex Records, Fire Ball Records, 504 Records, ERAH Records, Rounder Records

Hayward "Chuck" Carbo (January 11, 1926 – July 11, 2008) was an American R&B singer, best known for his time as a vocalist in the New Orleans group The Spiders.

Chuck Carbo was born in Houma, Louisiana, then moved with his family to the Zion City neighborhood of New Orleans in the early 1930s. Chuck and brother Leonard "Chick" Carbo sang in the choir at their minister father's church. Among their influences were the Golden Gate Quartet and the King Cole Trio. The brothers served in the Coast Guard during World II.

After the war the brothers became affiliated with the Zion City Harmonizers gospel quartet. Changing the name to the Delta Southernaires, the group performed on Sunday mornings on WWEZ. In 1953 they auditioned for Cosimo Matassa at J&M Studio with the songs John The Revelator and Bye and Bye. Matassa encouraged the group to consider singing Rhythm and Blues. Local guitarist and songwriter Adolph Smith wrote two songs for the newly rechristened Spiders, cut in their initial Imperial Records session. The R&B single was a two-sided hit with I Didn't Want To Do It reaching #3 on the R&B charts and You're The One following at #8. “Chuck wasn’t just an important R&B or doo-wop artist,” says New Orleans musician Deacon John Moore. “He came out of the church. He was one of the members of the Zion Harmonizers, along with Sherman Washington. When the Spiders started recording [R&B], they brought that old-time gospel sound with them. Their first record, ‘I Didn’t Want to Do It’ and ‘You’re the One,’ was a big, local jukebox hit. The jukeboxes were a barometer for local radio and they picked up on it. Then it broke nationally and the group was on its way.” At the first recording session the group had misgivings, so also recorded two gospel songs which were unreleased until 1994. Imperial Records A&R man and bandleader Dave Bartholomew took over the production work for The Spiders' follow-up releases, which were regional and local hits but didn't make the national charts. Conflicts within the group caused Chuck to leave, with Chick taking over lead vocals. The original Spiders reunited in 1955 to record Witchcraft which went to #7 on the R&B charts. Chick continued to front the Spiders. Chuck cut two singles under his own name for Imperial before being dropped by the label in 1957. Chuck Carbo continued to record as a solo artist, cutting discs for Rex Records, and Ace in the 1960s. Perhaps his best known song as a solo artist was his 1970 single, "Can I Be Your Squeeze" on Eddie Bo's Fire Ball Records.

Carbo continued to perform intermittently for the next several decades, though he took odd jobs (including as a truck driver) whenever he could not make a living performing. In 1988 Carbo recorded his first solo album Life's Ups and Downs on 504 Records, featuring guitarist Alvin Robinson, Dr. John, and Ed Frank. Second Line On Monday was released as a single. The flip side Meet Me With Your Black Drawers On (by Jeannie and Jimmy Cheatham) got attention and airplay on WWOZ in New Orleans. This led to a follow-up album Drawers Trouble on Rounder Records in 1993 featuring Dr. John and Ed Frank. A second full-length The Barber's Blues followed in 1996.

Carbo and his wife Gloria were the parents of nine sons and daughters. His granddaughter, Rolexis Delaney Schinsing is an actress who has appeared on HBO show Treme, OWN's Queen Sugar, and Daytime Emmy nominated network BYUtv's show Relative Race. Carbo died in July 2008, at the age of 82.

== Discography ==
- Life's Ups and Downs (504 Records, 1988)
- Drawers Trouble (Rounder, 1993)
- The Barber's Blues (Rounder, 1996)
