= Cornelius "Tenoo" Coleman =

American musician

Background information
- Also known as: Tenoo
- Born: Cornelius Jessie Coleman; July 5, 1928; New Orleans, Louisiana, U.S.
- Died: February 20, 1973 (aged 44) New Orleans, Louisiana, U.S.
- Genre: Rhythm and blues
- Occupation: Drummer
- Years active: c.1951 – 1973

Cornelius Jessie "Tenoo" Coleman (July 5, 1928 – February 20, 1973) was an American R&B drummer best known for playing with Fats Domino's band and on many of his hit records.

Tenoo Coleman was born in New Orleans. He was raised uptown on Rocheblave Street, in a rough neighborhood known as "The Blade".

== Career ==
Coleman first sat in with Fats Domino at the Mac Hansbury Lounge on Galvez Street, and joined his band in early 1951. He came aboard about the same time as guitarist Walter "Papoose" Nelson and sax man Wendell Duconge. He filled the chair previously held by Victor Leonard, Robert Stevens, Dave Oxley, Frank Parker, Willie Barbarin, John Cook, and Earl Palmer. After a successful string of hits on the charts only one song, "Rockin' Chair," hit the charts in 1951, in the final week in December. Fats continued touring with his new band. Domino's producer Dave Bartholomew had a brief falling out with Imperial Records owner Lew Chudd over money, so Fats went to work with producer Al Young, a local record store owner. He and his road band, including Coleman, went into the studio in January 1952. Released from that session was "Goin' Home" backed with "Reelin' and Rockin'". The A-side of the disc went to #1 on the R&B chart, and became the first R&B record to appear in the Pop chart, at #30.

Domino's band, on the road and in the studio beginning in 1952, consisted of Fats on piano and vocals, Buddy Hagans and Wendell Duconge on sax, "Papoose" Nelson on guitar, Billy Diamond on bass, and Coleman on drums. Years later Domino remembered this band as his "best ever." He especially valued the hard-driving Coleman. "Tenoo was left-handed and could really keep a beat," Fats recalled, "I used to have him set up his drums right next to the piano because the drummer is where I get my drive from."

Coleman was Fats Domino's drummer for 15 years, touring and playing on the majority of his Imperial Records recordings. From 1950 through 1962 Fats Domino sold sixty million records. During this time he established himself as "the cornerstone" of rock 'n' roll, according to Dave Bartholomew. Touring was a fact of life for the Fats Domino band. In 1957, for example, Domino and his band traveled 13,000 miles across the country working 355 shows, many of them sold out. He was the biggest rock 'n' roll act in the United States, but still Fats and his musicians suffered from segregation. Black musicians on the road often could not stay at white hotels, eat at white restaurants, were sometimes banned from using restrooms at gas stations, and forced to use "For Colored Only" facilities. In an incident in Breaux Bridge, Louisiana, in 1962, sax man Herb Hardesty was beset by a group of angry white men outside a club who mistook his light-skinned black girlfriend for white. Domino's band took cover inside the club as police quelled the altercation. Coleman, upset by the encounter, warned Hardesty, "Man, don't you ever do that to us again! Don't ever! Man, all of us could have been dead!"

On September 2, 1956, Coleman appeared with the Fats Domino band in its network television debut on The Steve Allen Show. Two months later on November 18 Fats performed with the band on The Ed Sullivan Show. Sullivan showed Fats at the piano and kept the band off-camera. On February 2, 1957, Fats performed with his band on The Perry Como Show. Como, like Sullivan, declined to show the band, keeping the cameras only on Domino. Como had the band back on May 25, this time showing Domino fronting his band. In 1957, Fats performed twice, once solo and once with his band, on the recently launched nationwide American Bandstand. These and other TV appearances kept the Fats Domino band in high profile.

Coleman appeared with Fats and his band in the feature film Shake Rattle And Rock! in 1956. Director Joe Lauro's 2015 Fats Domino documentary The Big Beat, highlights concert footage of Fats' band with drummer Coleman from the French National Archives.

January 1961 saw the Domino band, with Coleman on drums, on a tour of Jamaica, playing at the Jamaica Music Festival in Montego Bay, followed by 10 dates in Kingston. Jamaicans could pick up radio signals from New Orleans and Miami. Fats' records were being played regularly on Jamaican sound systems in the 1950s, and his accentuation of the offbeat is one of the roots of ska. His song "Be My Guest" was particularly influential in Jamaica. Musicians began copying that style in their songs, with the beat eventually beginning to bounce in its own Jamaican way. Bob Marley said reggae had its roots in Domino's music.

From February 1957 until the early 1960s, Charles "Hungry" Williams was the most in-demand drummer recording in New Orleans. But for Domino's recordings, Fats and Dave Bartholomew preferred Coleman. "Tenoo was one hell of a drummer," said Bartholomew, "one of the best drummers in the world..." Coleman recorded for some of Dave Bartholomew's solo releases, and also for Smiley Lewis, Pee Wee Crayton, T-Bone Walker, Billy Tate, Roy Brown, and Roosevelt Sykes. He was highlighted on Herb Hardesty's The Domino Effect: Wing & Federal Recordings 1958-1961 from Ace Records UK in the song "Rhumba Rockin' With Coleman". The album by Hardesty leading Fats Domino's band was recorded in 1958, but not issued until 2012.

== Style and influence ==
Charles "Hungry" Williams first studied drums during the time he spent in New Orleans' Municipal Boys Home. His musical education continued when he studied Coleman. Williams recalled, "Fats used to play at Bogen's Patio on Claiborne and Forstall, plus he was playing at another joint called the Hot Spot a block away. I got hooked up with Fats and I started valeting for Fats. Because all I'd do is go there and sit there and look at Cornelius Coleman, Tenoo was what we called him. I'd sit and watch him, because I idolized the dude. He was fast, man, fast." Williams continued, "And every time I got a chance, I'd set up Tenoo's drums like an hour before the gig, and I would sit on his drums and practice before the gig started." Coleman, left-handed like Williams, also taught Walter "Popee" Lastie.

Lastie recalled, "Every month they would have a children’s hour at the Hot Spot. That’s where Fats Domino used to play; and Cornelius Coleman would stand behind me with his hands on my shoulders. He was left-handed and he'd cross his hands and play beats on me, and if I played it wrong, he would slap me! So I had to learn that way." Lastie, would later play with Fats Domino, Professor Longhair, and Dr. John.

John "Jab'o" Starks was an R&B drummer from Mobile, Alabama. As a young man he was mentored on the drums by Coleman. "A lot of those New Orleans drummers would come through, and I got a lot of stuff from those guys", Starks said. "Tenoo [Coleman] was...as funky as any of them... I learned some of that funk by listening to Tenoo." Starks went on to play with Bobby "Blue" Bland and James Brown, among others.

Though New Orleans produced traditional drummers like Baby Dodds and Paul Barbarin, the city was also responsible for the R&B percussion practiced by such players as Coleman and Williams, two important drummers on the New Orleans scene.

Author Charles Suhor saw Coleman take on Ed Blackwell, in a battle of the drummers at an American Jazz Quintet show in the mid-1950s. He said Blackwell, "swung lightly through complex polyrhythmic lines, a brilliant colorist and phrase maker with swift wit embedded in daringly sculpted solos. Coleman was the slasher, juxtaposing thickly accented snare and tom rhythms with familiar Afro-Cuban beats of the day all of it bristling with pre-funk energy that contrasted with Blackwell’s Max Roach/Shelly Manne-style of improvisation." Suhor remembered the crowd responding more vigorously to Coleman, though his own tastes favored Blackwell. In August 1966, Fats Domino and his band played the Village Gate in New York City with Art Blakey and The Jazz Messengers. Blakey admired and befriended Coleman.

When Domino's band was on tour, other musicians stood in the wings to watch Coleman play. Drummers such as Elvin Jones came by to watch him play. "Everybody paid attention to Tenoo," said Bill Doggett. "He had that funny kind of rhythm that later became the style, that double stuff on the bass drum. The way he played his snare was, in what we call the vernacular now, a real funky beat." Author Rick Coleman stated, "A funky beat meant a drummer who improvised extra beats, not just for show, but to force people to dancer even harder, creating more positive sweat. New Orleans was the home of funky rhythms, dating back to Congo Square and Second Line parades, but notably played by drummers like Tenoo, his pupil Charles "Hungry" Williams, Joseph "Smokey" Johnson, and Joseph "Zigaboo" Modeliste of The Meters."

== Later years ==
In the early 1970s, Coleman played in Clarence "Frogman" Henry's band at the 500 Club on Bourbon Street, along with Domino band alumni sax man Clarence Ford and bass player Lawrence Guyton. In early 1973, after a show with Dave Bartholomew's band at the Fountainbleau Hotel, Coleman suffered a stroke and died at the age of 44.
