= Peter Badie =

American jazz musician (1925–2023)

Peter "Chuck" Badie (May 17, 1925 – April 15, 2023) was an American jazz bass player.

== Life and career ==
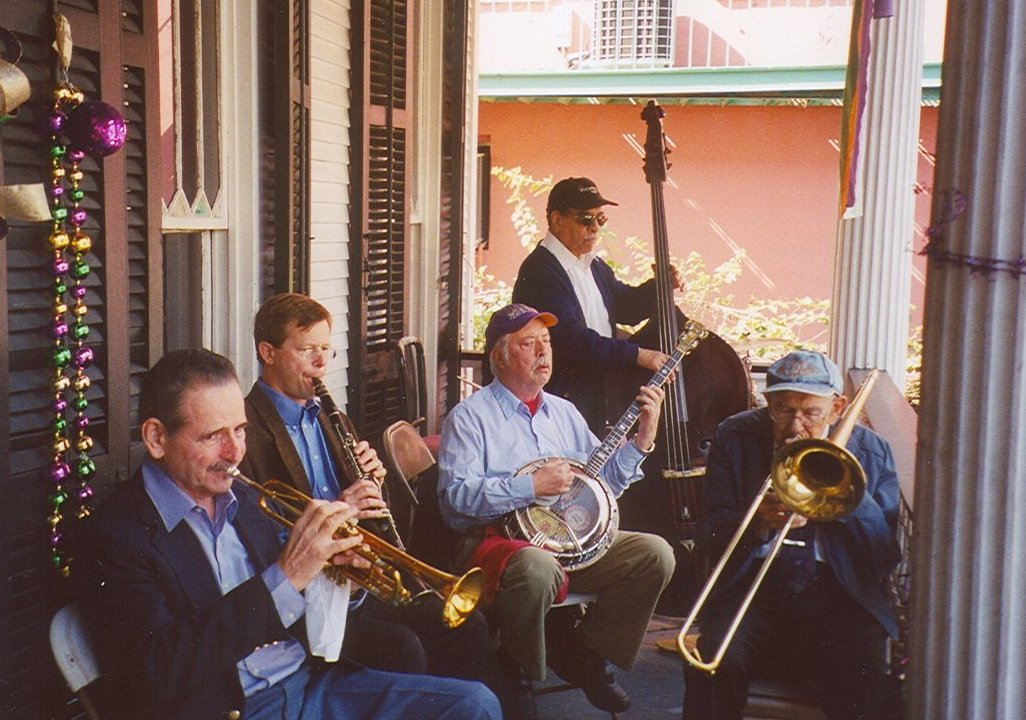
Badie on string bass with a jazz band in the French Quarter in 2005

Badie was born in New Orleans on May 17, 1925. His father was a prominent jazz saxophone player who played with the "Eureka" and the "Original Olympia" brass bands. He left the Navy in 1945, and then used the G.I. Bill to enrol at the Grunewald School of Music. From around 1950 he played with singer Roy Brown for two years. He then "worked with the singer Paul Gayten and Dave Bartholomew, then from 1954 to 1956 was a member of Lionel Hampton's orchestra."

Badie played double bass on some famous New Orleans rhythm-and-blues recordings. He worked with Hank Crawford, Edward Frank, June Gardner, Dizzy Gillespie, and Zoot Sims, but had to stop playing in the 1970s because of stomach problems. He returned to frequent playing in the 1990s, as part of Dr. John's band.

Badie was honored at the New Orleans Jazz Museum in February 2020 for 72 years in the music business.

Badie died on April 15, 2023, at the age of 97.

== Personal life ==
Badie was a devout Catholic and a member of the Knights of Peter Claver.
