= Lillian Boutté =

American jazz singer (1949–2025)

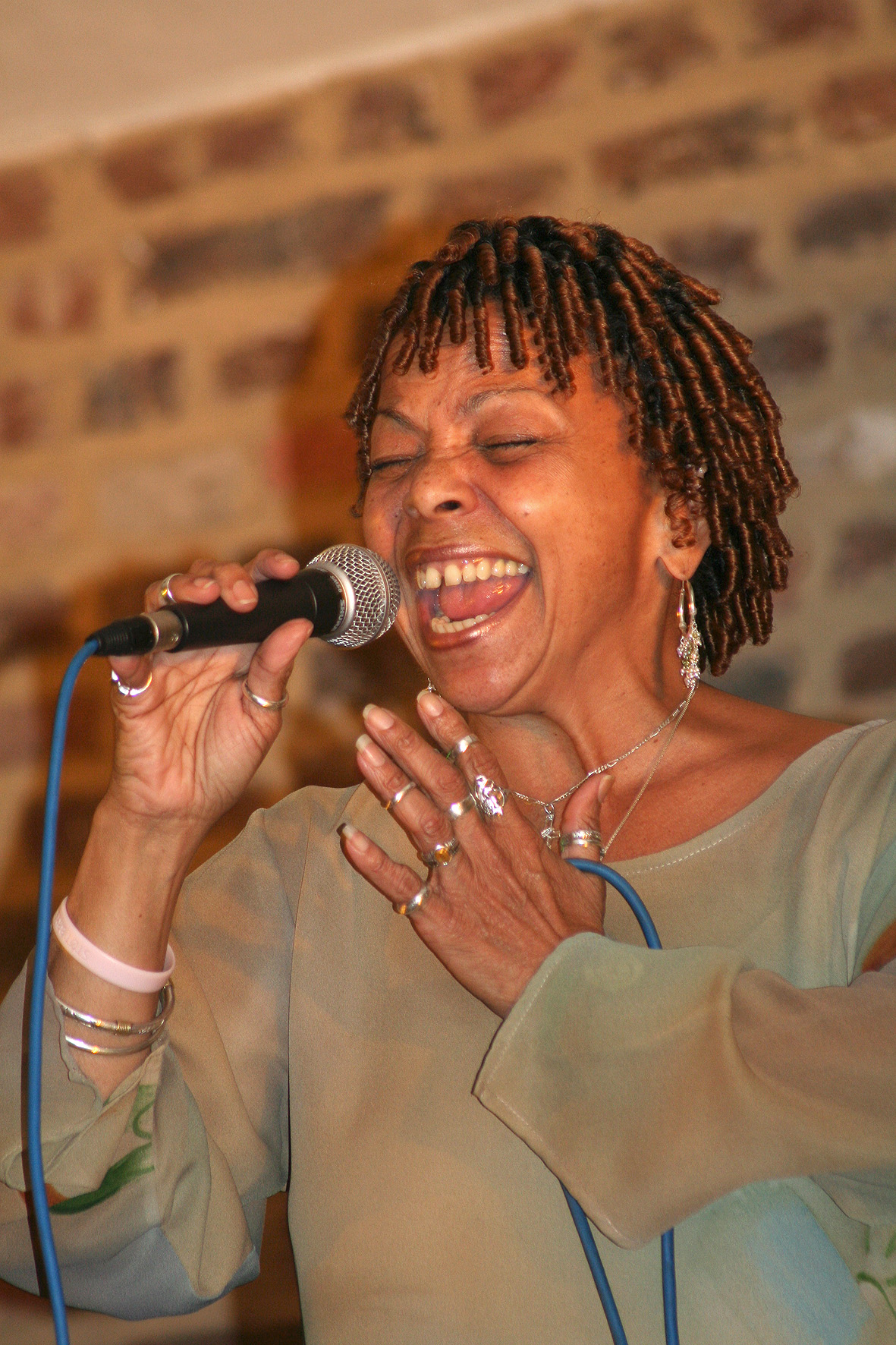
Boutté in 2006

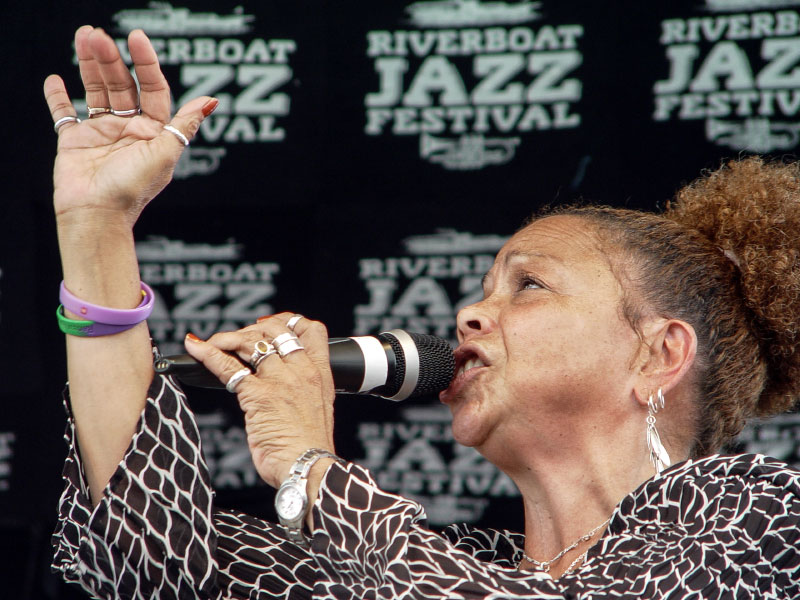
Boutté performing in Denmark, 2007

Lillian Theresa Boutté-l’Etienne (August 6, 1949 – May 23, 2025) was an American jazz and gospel singer.

== Early life and career ==
As a child, Boutté won a singing contest at age eleven. She later received a bachelor's degree in music therapy at Xavier University of Louisiana and worked as a session musician in New Orleans, performing as a backup singer with Allen Toussaint, James Booker, Patti LaBelle, The Pointer Sisters, Neville Brothers, and Dr. John. At Xavier, she sang in the Golden Voices Gospel Choir.

From 1979 to 1983 she toured internationally with the musical One Mo' Time. She collaborated with the Olympia Brass Band on a gospel record in 1980 and recorded her first jazz album in 1982. During her tours of Europe, she began recording with groups in Norway and Denmark, and co-founded the ensemble Music Friends.

She performed frequently in New Orleans in addition to touring regularly in Europe, performing with Humphrey Lyttelton, the Barrelhouse Jazz Band, Chris Barber, Oscar Klein, Dirk Raufeisen, the Maryland Jazz Band of Cologne, and Pee Wee Ellis.

== Personal life and death ==
Lillian Boutté was the older sister of fellow jazz singer John Boutté, and was formerly married to the German musician Thomas L'Etienne. She died following a lengthy battle with dementia and Alzheimer's disease, on May 23, 2025, at the age of 75.

== Discography ==
- Music Is My Life (Timeless, 1985)
- I Sing Because I'm Happy (Timeless, 1985)
- A Fine Romance with Thomas L'Etienne (GHB, 1987)
- Lillian with Humphrey Lyttelton (Calligraph, 1988)
- Lipstick Traces with Christian Willisohn (Blues Beacon, 1991)
- The Gospel Book (Blues Beacon, 1993)
- The Jazz Book (Blues Beacon, 1994)
- But...Beautiful (Dinosaur Entertainment, 1996)
- Come Together with Christian Willisohn (Art by Heart, 1997)
