= The Spiders (American band) =

American rhythm and blues vocal band

- Also known as: Zion City Harmonizers; Delta Southernaires
- Origin: New Orleans, Louisiana, U.S.
- Genres: R&B; Gospel
- Years active: 1947–1957
- Labels: Imperial
- Past members: Chuck Carbo; Leonard Carbo; Joe Maxon; Matthew West; Bill Moore; Issacher Gordon; Oliver Howard

The Spiders were an American R&B vocal group from New Orleans who recorded in the 1950s. Within a span of two years, the group had all five of their entries on the US Billboard R&B chart.

The group was founded as a gospel group in 1947 under the name Zion City Harmonizers, and later sang as the Delta Southernaires, recording and performing on radio under the latter name in 1952–1953. Cosimo Matassa convinced them to begin singing secular music, and in 1953 the five-piece, based around brothers Hayward "Chuck" Carbo (1926–2008) and Leonard "Chick" Carbo (1927–1998), signed with Imperial Records, under the name The Spiders. They had several U.S. hits on the R&B chart in the middle of the decade, including their first single "I Didn't Want to Do It" (R&B No. 3, 1954), "I'm Slippin' In" (R&B No. 6, 1954), "21" (R&B No. 9, 1955), and "Witchcraft" (R&B No. 5, 1956). The latter was co-written by Dave Bartholomew and was later covered by Elvis Presley.

Members Joe Maxon and Matthew West left the group in 1955 and were replaced by Issachar (Izzycoo) Gordon and Bill Moore. Chick Carbo signed with Atlantic Records as a solo artist late in 1956, and by the next year the group had splintered; their last single as a group was 1957's "That's My Desire", though the song "Tennessee Slim", recorded in the middle of the decade, was issued as a single in 1960.

Chuck Carbo later recorded for Rounder Records, releasing an album in 1993. Chick Carbo died in 1998, Chuck in 2008.

The group's name inspired the group led by Buddy Holly to name themselves the Crickets.

== Members ==
- Hayward "Chuck" Carbo
- Leonard "Chick" Carbo
- Joe Maxon
- Matthew West
- Bill Moore
- Issacher Gordon
- Oliver Howard
