= Melvin Lastie =

American R&B and jazz trumpeter (1930–1972)

Melvin Clarke Lastie, Sr. (November 18, 1930 – December 4, 1972) was an American R&B trumpeter, flugelhornist, and cornetist. He also played jazz and was a session musician on many soul and rock records of the 1960s.

Lastie was born in New Orleans, Louisiana to Frank and Alice Hill Lastie. Melvin's four brothers were Chester, David, Joseph, and Walter, and his sister was Betty Ann.

Lastie played with Paul Barbarin and Fats Domino while he was still a teenager. He served in the military during the Korean War, then formed a group with his brother David Lastie, which backed Big Joe Turner on tour throughout North America. He worked as a studio musician in the 1950s, including on recordings by Roy Brown, and played in a band led by Clarence Samuels alongside Ornette Coleman. In 1961, he co-founded AFO Records and worked with them as a producer and studio player both in New Orleans and after the company moved to Los Angeles. He played extensively on soul and jazz recordings, including by Sam Cooke, Hank Crawford, Lou Donaldson (Alligator Bogaloo, 1967), Dr. John, Aretha Franklin ("(You Make Me Feel Like) A Natural Woman"), Barbara George, Eddie Harris, Little Sonny Jones, Herbie Mann, David "Fathead" Newman, Dave Pike and The Rascals. Lastie was also active as an arranger, and played and arranged for several years in the 1960s for Willie Bobo. The song "Fried Neck Bones and Some Homefries" from the album Uno Dos Tres 1•2•3, written by Lastie and Bobo, was performed by Santana at Woodstock.

Lastie died from cancer in New Orleans in December 1972, at the age of 42.

== Other sources ==
- Val Wilmer, "Melvin Lastie". The New Grove Dictionary of Jazz. 2nd edition, ed. Barry Kernfeld.
