= George Thorogood and the Destroyers discography =

Cataloging of published recordings by George Thorogood and The Destroyers

George Thorogood discography
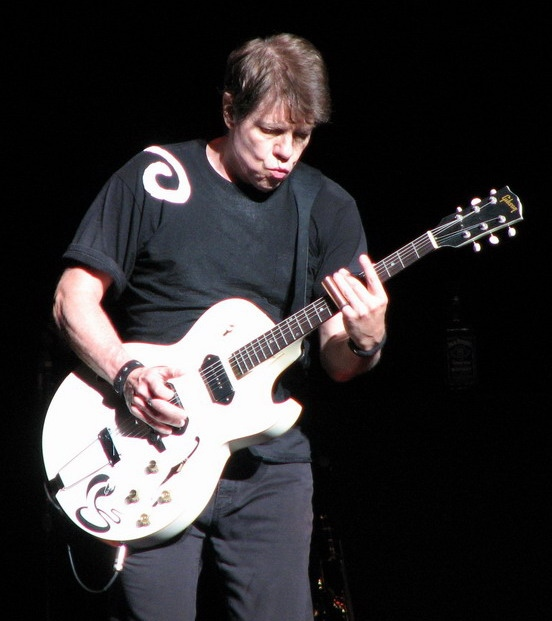
- Thorogood performing in the Fallsview Casino, Niagara Falls, Ontario
- Studio albums: 15
- Live albums: 8
- Compilation albums: 11
- Singles: 51
- Music videos: 10

The discography of the American blues rock band George Thorogood and the Destroyers consists of 15 studio albums, 8 live albums, 11 compilation albums and 51 singles. George Thorogood has released 1 solo album.

The Destroyers have sold more than 15 million records worldwide, two of their albums have been certified platinum, and six more certified gold by the Recording Industry Association of America (RIAA). Several of their albums have reached the Billboard 200 chart, while only one single reached the Billboard Hot 100 chart. Several of their albums have also reached charts in other countries, such as Australia, New Zealand, Canada, and others. Despite releasing many singles, only one has charted on the Billboard Hot 100, a cover of Johnny Otis' "Willie and the Hand Jive".

The Destroyers released their first albums with Rounder Records, before signing with EMI America Records in 1982. In 1998 they signed with CMC International, and released 2 albums with them. In the early 2000's they signed with Eagle Records, before returning to EMI America in 2009 to release The Dirty Dozen, and their latest studio album, 2120 South Michigan Ave. in 2011.

In 2017, George Thorogood released his first proper solo album, Party of One, with Rounder Records.

== Albums ==
=== Studio albums ===
List of albums, with selected chart positions
Year	Album details	Peak chart positions					Certifications (sales thresholds)
Year	Album details	US	US Blues	AUS	NZ	CA	Certifications (sales thresholds)
1977	George Thorogood and the Destroyers: Released: August 16, 1977; Label: Rounder; Format: CS, CD, LP	—	—	52	14	—	RIAA: Gold; MC: Platinum
1978	Move It On Over: Released: 1978; Label: Rounder; Format: CS, CD, LP	33	—	51	10	29	RIAA: Gold; MC: Platinum
1979	Better Than the Rest (Recorded in 1974): Released: September 1979; Label: MCA; Format: CS, LP	78	—	—	43	71	
1980	More George Thorogood and the Destroyers: Released: October 1980; Label: Rounder; Format: CS, CD, LP	68	—	97	36	30	MC: Gold
1982	Bad to the Bone: Released: July 26, 1982; Label: EMI America; Format: CS, CD, LP	43	—	50	31	11	RIAA: Gold; MC: Gold
1985	Maverick: Released: January 25, 1985; Label: EMI America; Format: CS, CD, LP	32	—	31	14	35	RIAA: Gold; MC: Gold
1986	Nadine (CD Rerelease of Better Than the Rest): Released: 1986; Label: MCA Records; Format: CS, CD	—	—	—	—	—	
1988	Born to Be Bad: Released: January 13, 1988; Label: EMI America; Format: CS, CD, LP	32	—	30	2	14	RIAA: Gold; MC: Platinum; RIANZ: Gold
1991	Boogie People: Released: February 26, 1991; Label: EMI America; Format: CS, CD, LP	77	—	45	13	29	
1993	Haircut: Released: July 27, 1993; Label: EMI America; Format: CS, CD, LP	120	—	41	37	22	MC: Gold
1997	Rockin' My Life Away: Released: March 25, 1997; Label: EMI America; Format: CD	—	5	200	—	—	
1999	Half a Boy/Half a Man: Released: April 13, 1999; Label: CMC International; Format: CD	—	—	—	—	—	
2003	Ride 'Til I Die: Released: March 25, 2003; Label: Eagle; Format: CD	—	2	—	—	—	
2006	The Hard Stuff: Released: May 30, 2006; Label: Eagle; Format: CD	—	2	—	—	—	
2009	The Dirty Dozen: Released: July 28, 2009; Label: Capitol; Format: CD	169	1	—	—	—	
2011	2120 South Michigan Ave.: Released: June 14, 2011; Label: Capitol; Format: CD	—	2	—	26	—	
"—" denotes releases that did not chart or were not released in that country.

=== Solo album ===
Year	Album details	Peak chart position
Year	Album details	US Blues
2017	Party of One: Released: August 4, 2017; Label: Rounder; Format: CD, LP	2

=== Live albums ===
List of albums, with selected chart positions
Year	Album details	Peak chart positions					Certifications (sales thresholds)
Year	Album details	US	US Blues	AUS	NZ	CA	Certifications (sales thresholds)
1986	Live: Released: August 13, 1986; Label: EMI America; Format: LP, CD, CS	33	—	21	5	30	RIAA: Platinum; MC: Gold
1995	Live: Let's Work Together: Released: April 1995; Label: EMI; Format: CD, CS	—	—	139	—	—	
1999	Live in '99: Released: November 23, 1999; Label: CMC International; Format: CD, CS	—	—	—	—	—	MC: Gold
2004	30th Anniversary Tour: Live: Released: October 19, 2004; Label: Eagle; Format: CD	—	—	—	—	—	MC: Gold
2010	Live in Boston 1982: Released: July 27, 2010; Label: Rounder; Format: CD	—	10	—	—	—	
2013	Live at Montreux 2013: Released: November 18, 2013; Label: Eagle; Format: CD	—	—	—	—	—	
2020	Live in Boston 1982: The Complete Concert: Released: December 18, 2020; Label: Rounder; Format: CD, LP	—	2	—	—	—	
2026	The Baddest Show On Earth: Greatest Hits Live: Released: June 12, 2026; Label: Craft Recordings; Format: CD, LP	—	—	—	—	—	

=== Compilation albums ===
List of albums, with selected chart positions
Year	Album details	Peak chart positions					Certifications (sales thresholds)
Year	Album details	US	US Blues	AUS	NZ	CA	Certifications (sales thresholds)
1989	The George Thorogood Collection: Released: May 1989; Label: EMI; Format: CD, CS	—	—	2	6	—	AUS: 2× Platinum; RIANZ: Platinum
1992	The Baddest of George Thorogood and the Destroyers: Released: July 28, 1992; Label: EMI America; Format: CD, CS	100	—	176	—	30	RIAA: Platinum; MC: Gold
2000	Anthology: Released: August 29, 2000; Label: Capitol; Format: CD, DI	—	—	—	—	—	
2003	Who Do You Love?: Released: March 4, 2003; Label: Rounder; Format: CD	—	—	—	—	—	
2004	Greatest Hits: 30 Years of Rock: Released: May 18, 2004; Label: Capitol; Format: CD, DI, LP	55	1	142	37	—	RIAA: Gold
2006	The Best of George Thorogood and the Destroyers: Released: June 6, 2006; Label: Direct Source Special Products/DSSP; Format: CD, CS	—	7	—	—	—	
2007	Taking Care of Business ^{a}: Released: March 19, 2007; Label: Recall Records; Format: CD	—	—	—	—	—	
2009	10 Great Songs: Released: November 16, 2009; Label: Capitol; Format: CD	171	1	—	—	—	
2013	Icon: Released: May 14, 2013; Label: Capitol; Format: CD	—	—	—	—	—	
2014	Millennium Collection: 20th Century Masters: Released: April 2014; Label: Capitol; Format: CD	—	—	—	—	—	
2022	The Original George Thorogood: Released: April 15, 2022; Label: Capitol; Format: CD, LP	—	4	—	—	—	
"—" denotes releases that did not chart or were not released in that country.

- ^a double disc of Ride 'Til I Die (w/ 2 bonus tracks) and 30th Anniversary Tour

== Singles ==
List of singles, with selected chart positions
Year	Title	Peak chart positions				Album
Year	Title	US Main. Rock	US	AUS	NZ	Album
1977	"Can't Stop Lovin'"	x	—	—	—	George Thorogood and the Destroyers
1978	"One Bourbon, One Scotch, One Beer"	x	—	—	—	George Thorogood and the Destroyers
1978	"Ride On Josephine"	x	—	—	—	George Thorogood and the Destroyers
1978	"Move It On Over"	x	—	—	—	Move It On Over
1978	"It Wasn't Me"	x	—	—	—	Move It On Over
1979	"Who Do You Love?"	x	—	—	—	Move It On Over
1979	"Cocaine Blues"	x	—	—	—	Move It On Over
1979	"So Much Trouble"	x	—	—	—	Move It On Over
1979	"My Way"	x	—	—	—	Better Than the Rest
1979	"In the Night Time"	x	—	—	—	Better Than the Rest
1980	"Bottom of the Sea"	x	—	—	—	More George Thorogood and the Destroyers
1980	"House of Blue Lights"	x	—	—	—	More George Thorogood and the Destroyers
1981	"I'm Wanted"	x	—	—	—	More George Thorogood and the Destroyers
1982	"Nobody But Me"	32	– (Note: "Nobody but Me" did not enter the US Billboard Hot 100 but did peak at number six on the Bubbling Under Hot 100 extension chart.)	—	—	Bad to the Bone
1982	"Bad to the Bone"	27	—	—	—	Bad to the Bone
1983	"Rock and Roll Christmas"	—	—	—	45	single only release
1985	"Gear Jammer"	26	—	—	—	Maverick
1985	"I Drink Alone"	13	—	—	—	Maverick
1985	"Willie and the Hand Jive"	25	63	—	—	Maverick
1985	"Memphis/Marie"	—	—	—	—	Maverick
1986	"Reelin' and Rockin'"	11	—	—	—	Live
1986	"Night Time"	—	—	—	—	Live
1988	"You Talk Too Much"	4	—	—	42	Born to Be Bad
1988	"Born to Be Bad"	3	—	—	—	Born to Be Bad
1988	"Treat Her Right"	39	—	74	—	Born to Be Bad
1991	"If You Don't Start Drinkin' (I'm Gonna Leave)"	5	—	109	—	Boogie People
1991	"Hello Little Girl"	15	—	—	—	Boogie People
1992	"I'm a Steady Rollin' Man"	18	—	—	—	The Baddest of George Thorogood and the Destroyers
1992	"Bad to the Bone" (remix)	—	—	—	—	The Baddest of George Thorogood and the Destroyers
1992	"Louie to Frisco"	—	—	—	—	The Baddest of George Thorogood and the Destroyers
1993	"Get a Haircut"	2	– (Note: "Get a Haircut" did not enter the US Billboard Hot 100 but did peak at number 24 on the Bubbling Under Hot 100 extension chart.)	28	15	Haircut
1993	"Gone Dead Train"	24	—	—	—	Haircut
1993	"Howlin' for My Baby"	12	—	—	—	Haircut
1994	"Killer's Bluze"	—	—	—	—	Haircut
1995	"Let's Work Together"	—	—	—	—	Live: Let's Work Together
1997	"Rockin' My Life Away"	—	—	—	—	Rockin' My Life Away
1998	"The Usual"	—	—	—	—	Rockin' My Life Away
1999	"I Don't Trust Nobody"	24	—	—	—	Half a Boy/Half a Man
1999	"Be Bop Grandma"	—	—	—	—	Half a Boy/Half a Man
2003	"You Don't Love Me, You Don't Care"	—	—	—	—	Ride 'Til I Die
2003	"American Made"	—	—	—	—	Ride 'Til I Die
2009	"Merry Christmas Baby"	—	—	—	—	30th Anniversary Tour: Live
2011	"Going Back"	—	—	—	—	2120 South Michigan Ave.
2018	"Shot Down/Ain’t Coming Home Tonight"	—	—	—	—	single only release
2020	"Bad to the Bone" (Live in Boston, 1982)	—	—	—	—	Live in Boston 1982: The Complete Concert
2020	"I'll Change My Style" (Live at Boston, 1982)	—	—	—	—	Live in Boston 1982: The Complete Concert
2020	"Ride on Josephine" (Live in Boston, 1982)	—	—	—	—	Live in Boston 1982: The Complete Concert
2026	"Who Do You Love" (Live In Atlanta 1980)	—	—	—	—	The Baddest Show on Earth: Greatest Hits Live
2026	"Ride On Josephine" (Live In Roslyn, NY 1978)	—	—	—	—	The Baddest Show on Earth: Greatest Hits Live
2026	"Born to Be Bad" (Live In Sarasota 2024)	—	—	—	—	The Baddest Show on Earth: Greatest Hits Live
2026	"Steppin' Out" (Live In Midland, Texas 2022)	—	—	—	—	The Baddest Show on Earth: Greatest Hits Live
"—" denotes releases that did not chart or were not released in that country. "x" denotes that chart did not exist at the time.

=== Music videos ===
Year	Title	Album
1982	"Nobody but Me"	Bad to the Bone
1982	"Bad to the Bone"	Bad to the Bone
1983	"Rock and Roll Christmas"	single only release
1985	"I Drink Alone"	Maverick
1985	"Willie and the Hand Jive"	Maverick
1988	"You Talk Too Much"	Born to Be Bad
1988	"Treat Her Right"	Born to Be Bad
1991	"If You Don't Start Drinkin' (I'm Gonna Leave)"	Boogie People
1991	"Hello Little Girl"	Boogie People
1993	"Get a Haircut"	Haircut
