= Greatest Hits: 30 Years of Rock =

2004 compilation album by George Thorogood and the Destroyers

Compilation album by George Thorogood and the Destroyers
- Released: May 18, 2004
- Genres: Boogie rock, blues-rock
- Length: 1:17:28
- Label: Capitol Records
- Producers: George Thorogood (tracks: 3, 4, 16), George Thorogood & The Destroyers (tracks: 1, 2, 5 to 15)

George Thorogood and the Destroyers chronology
Who Do You Love? (2003)	Greatest Hits: 30 Years of Rock (2004)	30th Anniversary Tour: Live (2004)

Professional ratings
Review scores
Source	Rating
AllMusic	4.5/5 stars
The Penguin Guide to Blues Recordings	3.5/4 stars

Greatest Hits: 30 Years of Rock is a compilation album by George Thorogood and the Destroyers, released in 2004. The album celebrates 30 years of the band, and includes two tracks which are new versions of previously released hits.

The album peaked at number 55 on the US Billboard 200 and reached number one on the Recording Industry Association of New Zealand chart.

== Track listing ==
No.	Title	Writer(s)	Original Album	Length
1.	"Madison Blues"	Elmore James	George Thorogood and the Destroyers, 1977	4:28
2.	"One Bourbon, One Scotch, One Beer"	John Lee Hooker	George Thorogood and the Destroyers, 1977	8:26
3.	"Move It on Over"	Hank Williams	Move It on Over, 1978	4:18
4.	"Who Do You Love?"	Ellas McDaniel	Move It on Over, 1978	4:25
5.	"Bad to the Bone"	George Thorogood	Bad to the Bone, 1982	4:49
6.	"I Drink Alone"	George Thorogood	Maverick, 1985	4:31
7.	"Gear Jammer"	George Thorogood	Maverick, 1985	4:33
8.	"Willie and the Hand Jive"	Johnny Otis	Maverick, 1985	4:03
9.	"The Sky Is Crying" (live)	Clarence Lewis, Elmore James, Morris Levy	Live, 1986	8:01
10.	"Reelin' & Rockin'" (live)	Chuck Berry	Live, 1986	5:48
11.	"You Talk Too Much"	George Thorogood	Born to Be Bad, 1988	4:34
12.	"If You Don't Start Drinkin' (I'm Gonna Leave)"	George Thorogood	Boogie People, 1991	4:11
13.	"Get a Haircut"	Bill Birch, David Avery	Haircut, 1993	4:07
14.	"Rockin' My Life Away" (alternate take)	Mack Vickery	previously unreleased	3:27
15.	"American Made"	Monty Byrom, Charlie Midnight, Steve Hunter	Ride 'Til I Die, 2003	4:06
16.	"Who Do You Love?" (Rothrock remix)	Ellas McDaniel	previously unreleased	3:34
Total length:				1:17:28

== Personnel ==
- George Thorogood – vocals, guitar, harmonica
- Ron Smith – guitar
- Billy Blough – bass guitar
- Jeff Simon – drums
- John Nagy – engineer
- Artwork by Diana Barnes [art direction]
- Artwork by Don Bailey [design]
- Compilation producer – Kevin Flaherty
- Executive producer – Mike Donahue
- Mastered by Terry Manning
- Producers – George Thorogood (tracks: 3, 4, 16), George Thorogood & The Destroyers (tracks: 1, 2, 5 to 15), Jim Gaines (tracks: 15), John Nagy (tracks: 3, 4, 16), Ken Irwin (tracks: 1 to 4, 16), Terry Manning (tracks: 6 to 14)
- Producer [Production Assistance] – John Nagy (tracks: 5), Ken Irwin (tracks: 5, 11)
