= The Baddest of George Thorogood and the Destroyers =

Compilation album by George Thorogood and the Destroyers
- Released: July 28, 1992
- Genres: Blues rock; boogie rock; hard rock
- Length: 55:53
- Label: EMI America
- Producers: Terry Manning; The Delaware Destroyers

George Thorogood and the Destroyers chronology
Boogie People (1991)	The Baddest of George Thorogood and the Destroyers (1992)	Haircut (1993)

Singles from The Baddest of George Thorogood and the Destroyers
- 1. "I'm a Steady Rollin' Man" Released: 1992; 2. "Bad to the Bone (remix)" Released: 1992; 3. "Louie to Frisco" Released: 1992

The Baddest of George Thorogood and the Destroyers is the second compilation album by American blues rock band George Thorogood and the Destroyers. It was released in 1992 by the label EMI America Records.

== Songs ==
The album is mostly a greatest hits compilation, but features the previously unreleased tracks "Louie to Frisco" and "I'm a Steady Rollin' Man". The album also features a new remix of "Bad to the Bone".

== Release ==
EMI America released The Baddest of George Thorogood on July 28, 1992. The album debuted at No. 122, and peaked at No. 100 on the Billboard 200 chart. The album was certified platinum by the Recording Industry Association of America (RIAA) on February 8, 1995.

Professional ratings
Review scores
Source	Rating
AllMusic	4.5/5 stars
The Penguin Guide to Blues Recordings	3/4 stars
The Rolling Stone Jazz & Blues Album Guide	3.5/5 stars

Three singles were released from the album, "I'm a Steady Rollin' Man", which peaked at No. 18 on the Mainstream Rock chart, the new remix of "Bad to the Bone", and "Louie to Frisco".

== Track listing ==
All tracks are written by George Thorogood, except where noted.

No.	Title	Writer(s)	Original Album	Length
1.	"Bad to the Bone (remix)"		previously unreleased	4:56
2.	"Move It On Over"	Hank Williams	Move It On Over, 1978	4:18
3.	"I'm a Steady Rollin' Man"	Robert Johnson	previously unreleased	3:43
4.	"You Talk Too Much"		Born to Be Bad, 1988	4:35
5.	"Who Do You Love?"	Ellas McDaniel	Move It On Over, 1978	4:20
6.	"Gear Jammer"		Maverick, 1985	4:34
7.	"I Drink Alone"		Maverick, 1985	4:32
8.	"One Bourbon, One Scotch, One Beer"	John Lee Hooker	George Thorogood and the Destroyers, 1977	8:27
9.	"If You Don't Start Drinkin' (I'm Gonna Leave)"		Boogie People, 1991	4:12
10.	"Treat Her Right"	Roy Head, Gene Kurtz	Born to Be Bad,1988	3:31
11.	"Long Gone"		Maverick, 1985	4:30
12.	"Louie to Frisco"	Chuck Berry	previously unreleased	4:15
Total length:				55:53

== Personnel ==
Musicians

- George Thorogood – vocals, guitar
- Jeff Simon – drums
- Bill Blough – bass
- Hank Carter – saxophone, vocals
- Steve Chrismar – guitar
- Ian Stewart – piano
- Uncle Meat Pennington – maracas

Technical

- The Delaware Destroyers – producer
- Terry Manning – producer, engineering, mixing
- John Nagy – engineering
- Henry Marquez – art direction
- Lu Ann Graffeo – design

== Charts ==
Chart (1992)	Peak position
Australian Albums (ARIA)	176
Canada (RPM)	36
US Billboard 200	100

== Certifications ==
Certifications for The Baddest of George Thorogood
Region	Certification	Certified units/sales
Canada (Music Canada)	Gold	40,000^{^}
United States (RIAA)	Platinum	1,000,000^{^}

^{^} Shipments figures based on certification alone.
