= Live in Boston 1982 =

Live in Boston, 1982

Live album by George Thorogood and the Destroyers
- Released: July 27, 2010
- Recorded: November 23, 1982
- Venues: Bradford Hotel, Boston
- Genres: Blues rock; boogie rock
- Length: 70:05
- Label: Rounder Records

George Thorogood and the Destroyers chronology
The Dirty Dozen (2009)	Live in Boston, 1982 (2010)	2120 South Michigan Ave. (2011)

Live in Boston, 1982 is a live album by American blues rock band George Thorogood and the Destroyers. It was recorded on November 23, 1982, at the Bradford Hotel in Boston (now the Royale Nightclub), and released on July 27, 2010 by Rounder Records. The album debuted at No. 12, and peaked at No. 10 on the Billboard Top Blues Album chart.

Professional ratings
Review scores
Source	Rating
AllMusic	3.5/5 stars
Classic Rock	3/5 stars

AllMusic reviewer Al Campbell wrote "This 1982 set doesn't contain any surprises, just an awfully good time that still sounds fresh, alive and, perhaps most importantly, fun."

== Track listing ==
No.	Title	Length
1.	"House of Blue Lights"	4:11
2.	"Kids From Philly"	2:18
3.	"I'm Wanted"	5:12
4.	"One Way Ticket"	5:28
5.	"One Bourbon, One Scotch, One Beer"	13:07
6.	"As the Years Go Passing By"	6:40
7.	"It Wasn't Me"	6:44
8.	"New Boogie Chillun"	7:55
9.	"Miss Luann"	4:28
10.	"Can't Stop Lovin'"	4:10
11.	"Move It On Over"	4:00
12.	"Wild Weekend"	2:05
13.	"Nobody but Me"	3:47
Total length:		70:05

== Live in Boston 1982: The Complete Concert ==
Live in Boston, 1982: The Complete Concert

Live album by George Thorogood and the Destroyers
- Released: December 4, 2020
- Recorded: November 23, 1982
- Venues: Bradford Hotel, Boston
- Genres: Blues rock; boogie rock
- Length: 143:57
- Label: Craft

George Thorogood and the Destroyers chronology
Live at Montreux 2013 (2013)	Live in Boston, 1982: The Complete Concert (2020)	The Baddest Show On Earth: Greatest Hits Live (2026)

Singles from Live in Boston, 1982: The Complete Concert
- 1. "Bad to the Bone" Released: October 9, 2020; 2. "I'll Change My Style" Released: October 30, 2020; 3. "Ride On Josephine" Released: November 20, 2020

Live in Boston, 1982: The Complete Concert is an expanded version of the original Live in Boston, 1982. The album adds 12 previously unreleased tracks from the same show.

The album was released on December 4, 2020, by Craft Recordings. It debuted at No. 12, and peaked at No. 2 on the Billboard Top Blues Album chart.

Professional ratings
Review scores
Source	Rating
American Songwriter	4/5 stars
Classic Rock	4.5/5 stars

== Track listing ==
Disc one track listing
No.	Title	Length
1.	"House of Blue Lights"	4:41
2.	"Kids from Philly"	2:22
3.	"Who Do You Love?" (*)	6:45
4.	"I'm Wanted"	5:19
5.	"Cocaine Blues" (*)	3:55
6.	"One Way Ticket"	5:22
7.	"One Bourbon, One Scotch, One Beer"	13:10
8.	"As the Years Go Passing By"	4:40
9.	"Spoken Introduction: The Dance Floor" (*)	1:47
10.	"It Wasn't Me"	7:03
11.	"Bottom of the Sea" (*)	3:25
12.	"Night Time" (*)	5:57
13.	"New Boogie Chillun'"	7:54

Disc two track listing
No.	Title	Length
1.	"I'll Change My Style" (*)	4:15
2.	"Miss Luann"	5:44
3.	"Madison Blues" (*)	5:55
4.	"The Sky Is Crying" (*)	8:53
5.	"I Can't Stop Lovin'"	4:11
6.	"Spoken Introduction: Audience Participation" (*)	0:51
7.	"Same Thing" (*)	4:23
8.	"Bad to the Bone" (*)	5:06
9.	"Move It on Over"	5:22
10.	"Wild Weekend"	2:05
11.	"Nobody but Me"	3:39
12.	"No Particular Place to Go" (*)	4:36
13.	"Ride on Josephine" (*)	8:21
14.	"Reelin' and Rockin'" (*)	8:16
Total length:		143:57

(*) Previously unreleased

== Personnel ==
Musicians

- George Thorogood – guitar, vocals
- Billy Blough – bass guitar
- Jeff Simon – drums
- Hank Carter – saxophone
