= The Baddest Show On Earth: Greatest Hits Live =

Live album by George Thorogood and the Destroyers
- Released: June 12, 2026
- Genre: Blues rock; boogie rock
- Length: 69:53
- Label: Craft Recordings

George Thorogood and the Destroyers chronology
Live in Boston 1982: The Complete Concert (2020)	The Baddest Show On Earth: Greatest Hits Live (2026)

Singles from The Baddest Show On Earth: Greatest Hits Live
- 1. "Who Do You Love?" Released: March 19, 2026; 2. "Ride On Josephine" Released: April 9, 2026; 3. "Born to Be Bad" Released: April 30, 2026; 4. "Steppin' Out" Released: May 23, 2026

The Baddest Show On Earth: Greatest Hits Live is a live album by American blues rock band George Thorogood and the Destroyers. It features various live recordings, recorded between 1978 and 2024. It was released on June 12, 2026, by Craft Recordings.

== Background and content ==
In February 2025, the Destroyers' embarked on their "Baddest Show on Earth Tour." The album was announced on March 19, 2026, with the release of the lead single, a previously unreleased performance of "Who Do You Love?."

The album consists of live recordings recorded between 1978 and 2024, of some of the Destroyers' most popular songs, with most of the tracks being previously unreleased.

== Release ==
Craft Recordings released The Baddest Show On Earth: Greatest Hits Live on June 12, 2026. Four singles were released, "Who Do You Love?" on March 19, "Ride On Josephine" on April 9, "Born to Be Bad" on April 30, and "Steppin' Out" on May 28.

== Critical reception ==
Jeroen Bakker of The Blues Magazine writes that "there are noticeable differences in sound quality when recordings from multiple decades are combined on a single release," but that "there is absolutely nothing wrong with the music itself. These songs truly come alive in a live setting." Hal Horowitz of Rock & Blues Muse writes: "Most of his hits are accounted for, all captured in their natural habitat, on stage in front of what are surely well lubricated audiences out for a dose of what Thorogood has always delivered; gutsy meat and potatoes roots rocking with grinding guitar and searing sax, surging from one highlight to the next. Not surprisingly, almost every selection is longer, hotter and more propulsive than its studio version."

== Track listing ==
No.	Title	Length
1.	"Who Do You Love?" (Live in Atlanta Georgia 1980)	5:18
2.	"Move It On Over" (Live in Boston Massachusetts 1982)	5:07
3.	"One Bourbon, One Scotch, One Beer" (Live in Atlanta Georgia 1980)	10:47
4.	"Ride On Josephine" (Live in Roslyn New York 1978)	5:50
5.	"Madison Blues" (Live in Boston Massachusetts 1982)	5:48
6.	"Bad to the Bone" (Live in Boston Massachusetts 1982)	5:10
7.	"Born to Be Bad" (Live in Sarasota Florida 2024)	4:53
8.	"Steppin' Out" (Live in Midland Texas 2022)	2:20
9.	"Howlin' for My Baby" (Live in Hyannis Massachusetts 2023)	5:58
10.	"Tail Dragger" (Live in Kansas City Missouri 2020)	6:09
11.	"Boogie Chillun" (Live in Toronto Canada 1978)	12:33
Total length:		69:53

- Tracks 8–11 are omitted from the vinyl release.

== Charts ==
Weekly chart performance for The Baddest Show On Earth: Greatest Hits Live
Chart (2026)	Peak position
US Top Blues Albums (Billboard)	13
