= The Dirty Dozen (album) =

2009 album by George Thorogood

Studio album by George Thorogood and the Destroyers
- Released: July 28, 2009
- Recorded: 2008–2009
- Studio: Glenwood Place Studios, Burbank, CA
- Genre: Blues rock; boogie rock
- Length: 49:04
- Label: EMI America
- Producer: Jim Gaines; Delaware Destroyers

George Thorogood and the Destroyers chronology
The Hard Stuff (2006)	The Dirty Dozen (2009)	2120 South Michigan Ave. (2011)

The Dirty Dozen is the fourteenth studio album by American blues rock band George Thorogood and the Destroyers. released in 2009 by the label EMI America Records. The Dirty Dozen reached No. 1 on the Billboard Top Blues Albums and was on the chart for 11 weeks. It also reached the Billboard 200 chart, peaking at No. 169.

== Background ==
The Destroyers entered the studio in September or October 2008 after wrapping up their summer tour with Buddy Guy. During the recording of the album the Destroyers ran out of new material, and EMI America suggested they include some songs from previous albums. Thorogood said he wanted to cover "very obscure songs you've never heard of" for this album, as well as mixing in older songs with the new material. Thorogood originally wanted the album to be called Unfinished Business. Recording of the album finished sometime in 2009.

== Release and content ==
EMI America released The Dirty Dozen on July 28, 2009. The album debuted, and peaked at No. 169 on the Billboard 200 chart, and No. 1 on the Billboard Top Blues Albums.

The album contains all cover material. The album is split into 2 'sides'. The album includes six new songs (1–6; 'side' one) and six classic favorites (7–12; 'side' two).

== Critical reception ==
The Dirty Dozen received mixed reviews from critics.

Professional ratings
Review scores
Source	Rating
AllMusic	3/5 stars
Boston Phoenix	3/4 stars
Ultimate Guitar	6.5/10

AllMusic's Tim Sendra wrote "Just as they sound virtually unchanged from the first time they stepped into a recording studio. George still has the same ferocious slide technique, his growling vocals have barely aged, and the band still has the feel of skilled musicians who know how to play it simple. In other words, GT & the Destroyers still rock, and if you were ever a fan, you still should be. The only real problem with this record is that as cool as it is to hear the band's 1991 take on "Six Days on the Road" or their tumble through Howlin' Wolf's "Howlin' for My Baby," it'd be better to hear more of the new tracks." A reviewer for Ultimate Guitar wrote "Although still a master musician on his new record The Dirty Dozen, George Thorogood fails to deliver the same magic as he did back in the 70s and 80s." Shawn Perry of Vintage Rock wrote "George Thorogood & The Destroyers can’t fail in their earnest ability to lock in and lay it down. Old school rock and roll, without the pretense and posturing, even three decades later, is still alive and well as long as this band is around."

== Track listing ==
"Side one"
No.	Title	Writer(s)	Length
1.	"Tail Dragger"	Willie Dixon	3:41
2.	"Drop Down Mama"	John Adam Estes	4:20
3.	"Run Myself Out of Town"	Wendell Holmes	3:03
4.	"Born Lover"	Muddy Waters	4:12
5.	"Twenty Dollar Gig"	Mickey Bones	3:16
6.	"Let Me Pass"	Ellas McDaniel	3:40

"Side two"
No.	Title	Writer(s)	Original album	Length
7.	"Howlin' for My Baby"	Dixon, Howlin' Wolf	Haircut, 1993	5:13
8.	"Highway 49"	Big Joe Williams	Born to Be Bad, 1988	5:46
9.	"Six Days on The Road"	Earl Green, Carl Montgomery	Boogie People, 1991	4:27
10.	"Treat Her Right"	Roy Head, Gene Kurtz	Born to Be Bad, 1988	3:32
11.	"Hello Little Girl"	Chuck Berry	Boogie People, 1991	3:46
12.	"Blue Highway"	Nick Gravenites, David Getz	Bad to the Bone, 1982	4:44
Total length:				49:04

== Personnel ==
=== Musicians ===
- George Thorogood – guitar, vocals
- Jim Suhler – guitar (tracks 1–6)
- Bill Blough – bass
- Jeff Simon – drums
- Buddy Leach – saxophone (tracks 1–6)
- Hank Carter – saxophone (tracks 7–12)
- Steve Chrismar – guitar (tracks 8–11)
- Ian Stewart – piano (track 12)
- Jake Vest – backing vocals (track 3)

=== Technical ===
Tracks 1–6 only, see album articles for other technical personnel.

- Mike Donahue – executive producer
- Delaware Destroyers – producer
- Jim Gaines – producer
- Shawn Berman – engineer
