= Bad to the Bone (George Thorogood and the Destroyers album) =

Studio album by George Thorogood and the Destroyers
- Released: July 26, 1982 (US); September 1982 (UK)
- Recorded: 1981–1982
- Studios: Dimension Sound Studios, Boston, Massachusetts
- Genres: Blues rock; boogie rock; hard rock
- Length: 41:38; 75:33 (25th Anniversary Edition)
- Label: EMI America
- Producer: The Delaware Destroyers

George Thorogood and the Destroyers chronology
More George Thorogood and the Destroyers (1980)	Bad to the Bone (1982)	Maverick (1985)

Singles from Bad to the Bone
- 1. "Nobody but Me" Released: July 1982; 2. "Bad to the Bone" Released: September 17, 1982

Bad to the Bone is the fifth studio album by American blues rock band George Thorogood and the Destroyers. It was released in 1982 by the label EMI America Records. The album contains the Destroyers' best known song, "Bad to the Bone", and also features Rolling Stones side-man Ian Stewart on piano. The band promoted the album with a worldwide tour; there was also a large marketing campaign by their label.

In the early 1980s, the Destroyers toured with the Rolling Stones and signed with EMI America. Bad to the Bone was recorded in late 1981 and early 1982, and was released on July 26, 1982. The album received positive reviews from critics and sold more than 500,000 copies.

A 25th anniversary edition of the album was announced and released in 2007, featuring a bonus track and 6 re-recordings of songs from the album.

== Background ==
In 1975, the Destroyers signed a recording contract with Rounder Records. With them, the Destroyers recorded three albums. In 1980, rhythm guitarist Ron Smith left the band, and was replaced by saxophonist Hank "Hurricane" Carter. The next year they toured as a support act for the Rolling Stones on their 1981 U.S. Tour. During the tour, they also met Ian Stewart, who wanted to work with them on their next album. Also that year the Destroyers embarked on their "50/50" tour, during which Thorogood wrote "Bad to the Bone".

In 1982, with their contract with Rounder Records expiring, the Destroyers signed with EMI America, who would help record and promote the album, which would be released in late July that same year.

== Recording ==
Recording of the album began at the Dimension Sound Studios in Jamaica Plains, Boston in late 1981, and finished in early 1982. The album was produced by the Destroyers themselves, although Thorogood said that "whoever engineered the session took credit for being the ‘producer’." The Rolling Stones keyboardist Ian Stewart played on the album, and helped record it.

== Songs ==
The sound of Bad to the Bone remained the same as their previous albums, with more originals written by Thorogood.

=== Side one ===
"Back To Wentzville" is the opening track of the album. It was written by George Thorogood, who wrote it as a tribute to rock pioneer Chuck Berry. The Destroyers performed the song on Saturday Night Live. The song is described by Gary Graff as a "Chuck Berry-styled rocker". "Blue Highway" is a song written by David Getz and Electric Flag frontman Nick Gravenites. The song starts with just guitar and Thorogood's voice, with the rest of the band joining in after the first chorus. It is one of six songs re-recorded for the 25th Anniversary Edition of the album.

"Nobody but Me" is a song written by The Isley Brothers. It was the lead single from the album. While the song did not enter the US Billboard Hot 100, it did peak at number six on the Bubbling Under Hot 100 extension chart. The song is often played live. "It's a Sin" is a blues song written by Jimmy Reed. It is described as an "introspective blues ballad" by Goldmine Magazine. "New Boogie Chillun" is a song written by John Lee Hooker. The song is one of six songs re-recorded for the 25th Anniversary Edition of the album, to a new length of 7 minutes and 10 seconds.

=== Side two ===
"Bad to the Bone" is a song written by Thorogood. It is often considered Thorogood's best song, and a staple of classic rock radio. The song was not popular upon release, however, its music video received recurrent appearances on MTV. The song's use in films, television, and commercials has since made it more popular. Thorogood wrote the song during their "50/50" tour, and first wanted Muddy Waters, and then Bo Diddley to record it, but both declined. The song was recorded in April 1982, and released as the second single from the album.

"Miss Luann" is an original written by Thorogood. Mark Mehler of Record interpreted the song's lyrics as a "tale of a girl everybody wanted but nobody got." The guitar hook was inspired by Keith Richards. Vintage Rock describes it as a "good time rocker". "As the Years Go Passing By" was written by Harrison "Peppermint" Harris but credited to Deadric Malone. The song is described by Gary Graff as a "nice change of pace, slow and soulful with a rich sax solo by Carter." "No Particular Place to Go" is a song written by Chuck Berry. The song is often played in live performances, and is included on several live albums. "Wanted Man" is a song by Johnny Cash, written by Bob Dylan. It is the album's closing track. "Lately, I’ve been listening to a lot of C&W, mostly Marty Robbins and Gene Autry," says Thorogood, "Wanted Man on this album is in that vein. It sounds mellow, but the attitude is bad, aggressive— a drifter wanted by the law. It's a very personal tune with me." Vintage Rock describes the re-recorded version as a "slightly slower, more ‘acoustic’ version"

=== Other songs ===
"That Philly Thing" is an instrumental, credited to Thorogood. It was first released as the B-side to "Nobody but Me", before being included as a bonus track for the 25th anniversary edition of Bad to the Bone. "EMI was still on the tail end of the days when people still released singles. And they released “Nobody But Me,” and they wanted an original for the flip side.", says Thorogood, "And that’s what we did with an instrumental that we were fooling around with."

A cover of Chuck Berry's "Louie To Frisco" was recorded, but wasn't included on the album. The song was eventually re-recorded and released on their album The Baddest of George Thorogood and the Destroyers.

== Release ==
EMI America released Bad To The Bone on July 26, 1982. It debuted at No. 127, and peaked at No. 43 on the Billboard 200 chart. The album sold around 275,000 copies in its first two months, and eventually sold more than 500,000 copies. The album was certified gold by the Recording Industry Association of America (RIAA) on August 7, 1985.

Two tracks from the album were released as singles. "Nobody but Me" was the lead single from the album. It was released in July 1982, as a 12-inch single, with "That Philly Thing" as its B-Side. The single peaked at number six on the Bubbling Under Hot 100 extension chart, and at No. 32 on the Mainstream Rock chart.

"Bad to the Bone" was released on September 17, 1982. The song peaked at No. 27 on the Mainstream Rock chart, but was not popular upon release. Its music video's recurrent appearances on MTV, and the song's use in films, television, and commercials have since made it more popular.

=== 2007 reissue ===
On August 14, 2007, a special edition of the album was released to mark the 25th anniversary of its original release. According to Thorogood, EMI wanted the Destroyers to re-record some of the songs from the album to include on the reissue, because there weren't many outtakes.

The re-issue featured the Instrumental B-side "That Philly Thing", as well as six re-recordings of some of the songs from the album. The re-recordings were recorded at the Ardent Studios in Memphis, Tennessee.

== Touring and promotion ==
To support the album, The Destroyers embarked on a worldwide concert tour. First playing shows in Canada in August, and the United States from mid-September to December 1982. In 1983 they played tour dates around the world, first playing 15 sold-out shows in Australia, before going to New Zealand. They also played shows in nightclubs in Japan from February 26 to March 3. After the tour dates in Japan, the band went to Europe to play a series of shows.

A show at the Bradford Hotel in Boston (now the Royale Nightclub) on November 23, 1982, was recorded and released as Live in Boston 1982, and later Live in Boston 1982: The Complete Concert.

Two music videos were filmed for songs from the album. One for "Bad to the Bone", which was directed and produced by Mark Robinson. and the other for "Nobody but Me".

== Critical reception ==
=== Original release ===
Bad to the Bone received positive reviews from critics.

Professional ratings
Review scores
Source	Rating
AllMusic	4.5/5 stars
All Music Guide to the Blues	5/5 stars
The Penguin Guide to Blues Recordings	3/4 stars
Robert Christgau	B−
The Rolling Stone Jazz & Blues Album Guide	3.5/5 stars
The Virgin Encyclopedia of the Blues	3/5 stars

Lin Brehmer of WQBK wrote "George continues to infuse an old idiom with new life. The album's production sounds crisp and "Bad To The Bone" and "Boogie Chillun" are killers." Rob Lipshutz of WAAF said that Bad to the Bone is "faithfully authentic rock and roll." Bill Simmons of WMYK called the album a "rock and roll masterpiece." Robert Christgau says "Thorogood has added true boogie power to his blues, so his Diddley and Hooker no longer sound like three-quarter-size juke-joint facsimiles. And in a predictable trade-off, he's added true boogie macho to his persona, so he gets his rocks off complaining about the Mann Act." AllMusic's Tim Sendra says that "On his first major label record 1982's "Bad to the Bone" made for Capitol, he and his tight-as-duck-feathers band don't change a single note of their hard rocking, beer guzzling sound. Only the size of the bar has changed," and "Next to Move It on Over, this is Thorogood's finest work and established him as one of the unsung heroes of the age of AOR".

=== 25th Anniversary edition ===
25th Anniversary edition ratings
Review scores
Source	Rating
Record Collector	3/4 stars
The Music Box	3/5 stars

The re-recorded bonus tracks from the 25th anniversary edition of the album received mixed reviews from critics.

AllMusic's Tim Sendra wrote "These recordings show that the George can still whip up some excitement but they dilute the power of the original album. Plus both "Bad to the Bone" (which oddly enough seems to be missing a note in the instantly recognizable riff) and "New Boogie Chillun" are stretched out past the seven-minute mark, which might be fun in a crowded bar but are tiresome on CD." The Music Box reviewer John Metzger says that the re-recorded "As the Years Go Passing By" and "Wanted Man" "benefit immensely from improved vocals and more inspired guitar solos and arrangements," but that "No Particular Place to Go" and the title track "merely make the case that Thorogood remains capable of growing his way through his harder-edged fare," adding that "While Bad to the Bone still isn't an essential album, it nonetheless is as enjoyable as ever." William Pinfold of Record Collector wrote that the bonus tracks "will lure hardcore fans, but though solid, they aren’t essential," and that they are "hardly an improvement on the originals."

== Track listing ==
=== Original release ===
Side one
No.	Title	Writer(s)	Length
1.	"Back to Wentzville"	George Thorogood	3:33
2.	"Blue Highway"	Nick Gravenites, David Getz	4:44
3.	"Nobody but Me"	The Isley Brothers	3:28
4.	"It's a Sin"	Jimmy Reed	3:32
5.	"New Boogie Chillun"	John Lee Hooker	5:04

Side two
No.	Title	Writer(s)	Length
1.	"Bad to the Bone"	George Thorogood (*)	4:52
2.	"Miss Luann"	George Thorogood	4:13
3.	"As the Years Go Passing By"	Deadric Malone	5:03
4.	"No Particular Place to Go"	Chuck Berry	4:00
5.	"Wanted Man"	Bob Dylan	3:12
Total length:			41:38

(*) Musician James Pobiega (stage name "Little Howlin' Wolf"), has claimed that he wrote "Bad to the Bone" and that George Thorogood stole the song from him.

=== 25th Anniversary edition ===
No.	Title	Writer(s)	Length
1.	"That Philly Thing"	George Thorogood	2:25
2.	"Blue Highway"	Nick Gravenites, David Getz	4:08
3.	"New Boogie Chillun"	John Lee Hooker	7:10
4.	"No Particular Place to Go"	Chuck Berry	4:26
5.	"As the Years Go Passing By"	Deadric Malone	4:44
6.	"Bad to the Bone"	George Thorogood	7:05
7.	"Wanted Man"	Bob Dylan	3:57
Total length:			75:33

== Personnel ==
Musicians

- George Thorogood – vocals, guitar
- Billy Blough – bass guitar
- Jeff Simon – drums and percussion
- Hank Carter – saxophone, vocal

Additional musicians

- Ian Stewart – piano, keyboards

Technical

- The Delaware Destroyers – producers
- John Nagy – assistant producer and engineer
- Ken Irwin – assistant producer
- Paul Mufson – engineer
- Bill Burks - design

== Charts ==
=== Weekly charts ===
Chart (1982–1983)	Peak position
Australia (Kent Music Report)	50
Canada (RPM)	11
New Zealand (RMNZ)	31
US Billboard 200	43

=== Year-end charts ===
Chart (1982)	Position
Canada (RPM)	78
US Billboard 200	182

== Certifications ==
Certifications for Bad To The Bone
Region	Certification	Certified units/sales
Canada (Music Canada)	Gold	40,000^{^}
United States (RIAA)	Gold	500,000^{^}

^{^} Shipments figures based on certification alone.

== Release history ==
Date	Version	Ref.
July 26, 1982	Original vinyl	
February 27, 1989	Original CD	
February 27, 1989	Original cassette	
August 14, 2007	25th Anniversary edition CD	
March 30, 2018	Vinyl re-issue	
