= Rock and Roll Christmas =

Rock and Roll Christmas may refer to:

- A Rock and Roll Christmas, a 1995 Christmas rock compilation album
  - "Rock and Roll Christmas", a 1983 song by George Thorogood and the Destroyers that appears on the album
- "Another Rock and Roll Christmas", a 1984 Christmas song by Gary Glitter
- Rock 'n' Roll Christmas, a 2011 EP by the Connection
