= Wanted Man (Johnny Cash song) =

1969 song by Johnny Cash

"Wanted Man" is a song by Johnny Cash, written by Bob Dylan.

Cash first released it on his 1969 live album At San Quentin, recorded at San Quentin State Prison. This performance occurred only a week after he learned the song from Dylan. A studio recording of the song was released in 1970 on Cash's album Little Fauss and Big Halsy, which was the soundtrack to the film of the same name.

The song has been covered by many artists, including George Thorogood & The Destroyers (1982) and Nick Cave and the Bad Seeds (1985).

In 2019, a demo version of this song, sung in a duet by Dylan and Cash, was released on Dylan's The Bootleg Series Vol. 15: Travelin' Thru, 1967–1969. This version featured Carl Perkins on guitar.

== Content ==
The song is about a fugitive who requests listeners not to blow the whistle on him, should he be spotted. The fugitive mentions several cities and states where he is wanted, as well as other unmentioned locations and several women from his past who seek to turn him in.

Locations in which the protagonist is wanted (states in bold text)
