= Party of One (George Thorogood album) =

2017 album by George Thorogood

Studio album by George Thorogood
- Released: August 4, 2017
- Recorded: 2016–2017
- Studio: Aum Studio Productions, Bakersfield, CA; House Of Blues Studios, Encino, CA
- Genre: Blues rock; boogie rock; acoustic rock
- Length: 43:00; 46:43 (CD release)
- Label: Rounder
- Producer: Jim Gaines

Singles from Party of One
- 1. "Wang Dang Doodle" Released: June 23, 2017; 2. "No Expectations" Released: July 7, 2017; 3. "Pictures from Life's Other Side" Released: July 21, 2017

Party of One is the debut solo album by American blues rock artist George Thorogood. It was released August 4, 2017 by the label Rounder Records. Party of One is the first album Thorogood recorded and released without his long-time backing band "the Destroyers".

The album received positive reviews from critics and sold well on release.

== Background and recording ==
George Thorogood intended to record a solo album since the early days of his career, but never got around to doing it. In 2017, Thorogood returned to his label Rounder Records to release a solo album. Thorogood said: "I guess it was long overdue. The record label (Rounder) had been on me for some time to put out a solo album." It took Thorogood over a year to record the album.

The album was recorded at the House Of Blues Studios, in California, and produced by Jim Gaines. Thorogood said that the process of recording the album was hard and challenging.

== Release and content ==
Rounder Records released Party of One on August 4, 2017. The album debuted, and peaked at No. 2 on the Billboard Top Blues Album chart.

The album is composed entirely of blues covers, from artists Thorogood said "really mean something to me," as such, it features covers of songs by the Rolling Stones, Hank Williams, Johnny Cash, Bob Dylan, John Lee Hooker, and others. The album also features a cover of "Soft Spot," written by Gary Nicholson and Allen Shamblin. "I live in the United States of America, that prides itself on being maybe the richest country in the world, and I can’t believe that there are adult people living in the streets here, thousands of them," says Thorogood, "I was thinking it’s up to us regular working-class people to help these people out, because the government's not helping. I was all about that anyway, before I heard the song. So I said: "I've gotta do this. Even though I don’t play it all that good – it’s a little out of my style. But the message isn't out of my style." The album also contains a live version of "One Bourbon, One Scotch, One Beer" recorded live, at Rockline in 1999. CD versions of the album also feature a bonus track, a cover of "Dynaflow Blues", written by John Ned Shines.

== Critical reception ==
Party of One received positive reviews from critics on release.

Professional ratings
Review scores
Source	Rating
AllMusic	3.5/5 stars
Classic Rock	3.5/5 stars
Record Collector	3/4 stars
Music Connection	9/10
The Philadelphia Inquirer	3/4 stars
Exclaim!	7/10
Paris Move	4/4 stars

AllMusic`s Mark Deming says "Party of One suggests Thorogood has had his greatest success playing rowdy electric blues-rock for a reason -- it's clearly his strong suit -- but 40 years after the release of his debut album, the guy is more than entitled to a change of pace." Matt Bauer of Exclaim! wrote "So, while the all-covers Party of One's primarily acoustic instrumentation — performed entirely by Thorogood — may not what be long-term fans were expecting, there's a true reverence for the blues" Writing for Record Collector, Terry Staunton says "In tandem with George giving the ol’ larynx room to breathe and impress, his guitar-playing takes on a different tone in the comparatively subdued setting. There’s less need for the powerhouse riffing of yore, paving the way for nimble fretwork aplenty on Bob Dylan’s Down The Highway and Willie Dixon’s Wang Dang Doodle."

== Track listing ==
Party of One Track listing
No.	Title	Writer(s)	Length
1.	"I'm a Steady Rollin' Man"	Robert Johnson	2:52
2.	"Soft Spot"	Gary Nicholson, Allen Shamblin	1:44
3.	"Tallahassee Women"	Tallahassee Tight	3:10
4.	"Wang Dang Doodle"	Willie Dixon	2:42
5.	"Boogie Chillen"	Bernard Besman, John Lee Hooker	3:20
6.	"No Expectations"	Mick Jagger, Keith Richards	3:57
7.	"Bad News"	John D. Loudermilk	3:03
8.	"Down the Highway"	Bob Dylan	3:27
9.	"Got to Move"	Elmore James, Marshall Sehorn	3:12
10.	"Born with the Blues"	Brownie McGhee	2:15
11.	"The Sky Is Crying"	Elmore James, Clarence Lewis, Morgan Robinson	4:11
12.	"The Hookers (If You Miss 'Im...I Got 'Im)"	John Lee Hooker	3:02
13.	"Pictures from Life's Other Side"	Traditional	2:48
14.	"One Bourbon, One Scotch, One Beer" (live from Rockline)	John Lee Hooker	3:31
Total length:			43:00

CD release bonus track
No.	Title	Writer(s)	Length
15.	"Dynaflow Blues"	John Ned Shines	3:43
Total length:			46:43

== Personnel ==
Musicians

- George Thorogood – vocals, guitar

Technical

- Jim Gaines – producer
- Scott Billington – executive producer
