= Deer Park Tavern =

- Deer Park Hotel
- U.S. National Register of Historic Places
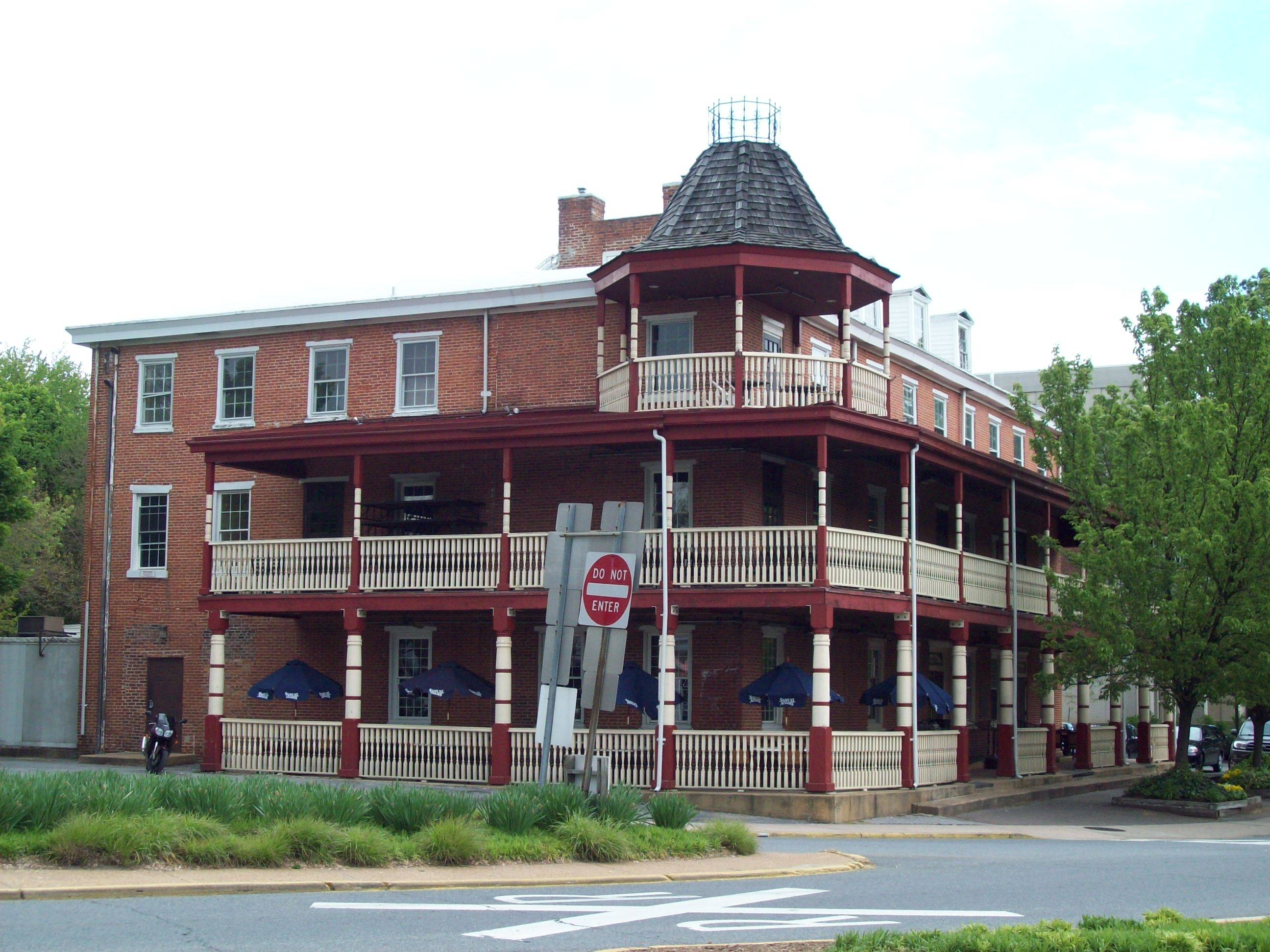
- Deer Park Tavern, April 2010

- Location within Delaware Location within the United States
- Location: 108 W. Main St., Newark, Delaware
- Coordinates: 39.683184°N 75.755982°W
- Area: 0.7 acres (0.28 ha)
- Built: 1851
- Architectural style: Greek Revival
- MPS: Newark MRA
- NRHP reference No.: 82002341
- Added to NRHP: May 7, 1982

Deer Park Tavern is a historic hotel located at Newark in New Castle County, Delaware. It was built in 1851 on the land where the remains of the burned down St. Patrick's Inn had resided since 1747. It is a 3 1/2-story "U"-plan building with nine bays at the south front facade. The building is constructed of wood joists with brick and masonry load bearing walls with Greek Revival elements. It was converted from a hotel in the mid-20th century, and enjoys the college atmosphere of the nearby University of Delaware campus.

The St. Patrick's Inn was said to house famous historical figures such as George Washington and in 1843 Edgar Allan Poe stayed a night here. The Deer Park logo is based on Poe's classic poem "The Raven". It is said that Poe fell in some mud, cursed the tavern and its patrons and haunts the building to this day.

In the Fall of 1764, Mason and Dixon made their base of operations in Delaware at the St. Patrick's Tavern in Newark, where the Deer Park Tavern now stands. Tavern scenes in Thomas Pynchon's 1997 novel Mason & Dixon are consistent with at least one contemporary account of their enjoyment of the taproom.

The first railroad line built through Newark in 1869 is close to the building, and helped to escalate the hotel's popularity. At this time, The Deer Park was considered one of the finest hotels on the east coast. Much history surrounds the Deer Park including rumors that the basement was used as part of the Underground Railroad before the Civil War.

In 1955, the Amalgamated and Condensed Chemist's Club charter at the University of Delaware's founding chapter was written in the old dining room of the Deer Park. Founders, "in the good old Boswellian tradition", included Carling, LePera, Jordan, Lafferty, Baldwin, Hoffner, Baird, Skinner, deBrabender and Wilson. Today, the patrons include University of Delaware students and staff, business people and locals. The nightly atmosphere varies with bands, DJs and drink specials that bring a hefty crowd each night of the week.

In the 1970s, local bands such as George Thorogood and the Delaware Destroyers played the back room. On October 5, 2010 MSNBC political TV show The Rachel Maddow Show broadcast its show live from the second floor of the Deer Park, which was chosen due to Delaware's upcoming U.S senatorial election. Maddow remarked on her show: "we live for the intersection of politics and beer".

It was added to the National Register of Historic Places in 1982.

== Pop culture ==
In season six episode 2 of It's Always Sunny In Philadelphia ("Dennis Gets Divorced") Mac is seen wearing a Deer Park tee shirt.

== See also ==
- National Register of Historic Places listings in Newark, Delaware
