= Rockin' My Life Away =

1997 American blues rock album by George Thorogood and the Destroyers

Studio album by George Thorogood and the Destroyers
- Released: March 25, 1997
- Recorded: November–December 1996
- Genre: Blues rock; Boogie rock
- Length: 44:33
- Label: EMI America
- Producer: Delaware Destroyers; Waddy Wachtel

George Thorogood and the Destroyers chronology
Live: Let's Work Together (1995)	Rockin' My Life Away (1997)	Half a Boy/Half a Man (1999)

Singles from Rockin' My Life Away
- 1. "Rockin' My Life Away" Released: 1997; 2. "The Usual" Released: 1998

Rockin' My Life Away is the tenth studio album by American blues rock band George Thorogood and the Destroyers. It was released in 1997 by the label EMI America Records. The album peaked at No. 5 on the Billboard Top Blues Albums chart, and spent 9 weeks on the chart.

Rockin' My Life Away was the first Destroyers studio album since Haircut in 1993. The album was recorded from November to December 1996, and was released March 25, 1997. It was their first album, since their debut in 1977, to not reach the Billboard 200, which caused EMI America to drop them the next year.

== Background and recording ==
In 1995 the Destroyers embarked on a summer tour, after which they began preparing material for Rockin' My Life Away. Waddy Wachtel wanted to work with them, and after a show, Thorogood and Wachtel met for the first time. The album was recorded from November to December 1996 in Los Angeles.

== Songs ==
The album consists of 12 songs, ten covers, and two originals, written by Thorogood.

"Get Back Into Rockin'" was written by Jerry Lynn Williams. Thorogood first heard the song in a demo tape by Williams, liked it, and decided to record it. "Trouble Every Day" was written by Frank Zappa. The Destroyers recorded the song as a tribute to him. "Night Rider" was written by Thorogood. According to him,

"It took me about eight minutes to get those lyrics together because Waddy said 'you got this riff what do you want to call this thing?' I go 'Let's look through the Allman Brothers entire catalog then the Doobie Brothers and Johnny Winter and see how many Night Rider's there are out there. He said 'you got lyrics?' and I said 'Sure, I got lyrics.' Of course, I didn't at that time. I went home and snuck off to the toilet and starting writing."

"The Usual" was written by John Hiatt, who was a good friend of George's. It was released as a single. "Rockin' My Life Away" was written by Mack Vicekry. Thorogood decided to record it after hearing the Jerry Lee Lewis cover of the song. It was first recorded during the recording sessions for Haircut in February 1993, before being re-recorded for this album. The February 1993 recording made it on their compilation album Greatest Hits: 30 Years of Rock. It was the lead single from the album. "Manhattan Slide" was written by Elmore James, while "Jail Bait" was written by Andre Williams.

== Release ==
EMI America released Rockin' My Life Away on March 25, 1997. Two tracks from the album were released as singles, "Rockin' My Life Away" and "The Usual". The album debuted, and peaked at No. 5 on the Billboard Top Blues Albums chart. The album spent 9 weeks on that chart.

== Reception ==
Rockin' My Life Away received mixed reviews from critics.

Professional ratings
Review scores
Source	Rating
AllMusic	2.5/5 stars
The Great Rock Discography	3/10
The Rolling Stone Jazz & Blues Album Guide	3/5 stars
The Virgin Encyclopedia of the Blues	2/5 stars

AllMusic's Stephen Thomas Erlewine says "and while he's losing energy as he ages, it actually adds some subtlety to his music. Still, if Rockin' My Life Away is anything, it's bloozy boogie and it's predictable, and for longtime fans, the lack of spark may cancel out the strength of the material." A reviewer for RPM magazine wrote that the album "may not be entirely new material, but it is more than enough to keep many a Thorogood fan happy". A Hartford Courant reviewer says that he "kept expecting the band to get in my face and start rocking. That didn't happen, but Rockin' My Life Away is still a nice, albeit misnamed, blues album."

== Track listing ==
No.	Title	Writer(s)	Length
1.	"Get Back Into Rockin'"	Jerry Lynn Williams	4:16
2.	"Trouble Every Day"	Frank Zappa	4:16
3.	"Night Rider"	George Thorogood	3:43
4.	"The Usual"	John Hiatt	3:51
5.	"Living With The Shades Pulled Down"	Merle Haggard	3:26
6.	"Manhattan Slide"	Elmore James	3:20
7.	"Rockin' My Life Away"	Mack Vickery	3:32
8.	"Jail Bait"	Andre Williams	3:42
9.	"My Dog Can't Bark"	Otis "Big Smokey" Smothers	4:00
10.	"Blues Hang-Over"	Slim Harpo, J. D. Miller	4:18
11.	"Stoop Down"	Chick Willis	3:18
12.	"Rock & Roll Man"	Thorogood	2:51
Total length:			44:33

== Personnel ==
The following personnel are credited on the album:

=== Musicians ===
- George Thorogood – rhythm guitar, slide guitar, vocals
- Waddy Wachtel – lead guitar, producer
- Billy Blough – bass
- Jeff Simon – drums
- Hank Carter – guitar, keyboards, saxophone, vocals
- Tony Berg – tambourine, tamboura on "Night Rider"

=== Technical ===
- Delaware Destroyers – producer
- Brian Scheuble – engineer
- Jim Liberato – guitar technician
- Henry Marquez – art direction
- Robert Laverdiere – package design
- Chris Cuffaro – photography

== Charts ==
Chart (1997)	Peak Position
Australia (ARIA)	200
Finland (Official Finnish Charts)	37
US Billboard Top Blues Albums	5
