= Night Time (song) =

Single by The Strangeloves

from the album I Want Candy
- B-side: "Rhythm of Love"
- Released: December 1965 (U.S.)
- Genre: Garage rock; proto-punk
- Length: 2:29
- Label: Bang
- Songwriters: Bob Feldman; Jerry Goldstein; Richard Gottehrer
- Producer: The Strangeloves

The Strangeloves singles chronology
"Cara-Lin" (1965)	"Night Time" (1965)	"Hide and Seek" (1966)

"Night Time" is a song written and originally recorded by the Strangeloves in 1965. It was written by Bob Feldman, Jerry Goldstein and Richard Gottehrer, and is a track from their I Want Candy LP.

The song reached No. 30 on the U.S. Billboard Hot 100 chart and No. 21 on the Cash Box Top 100. It did not chart internationally except briefly in Australia. "Night Time" appeared on the 1972 garage rock compilation Nuggets: Original Artyfacts from the First Psychedelic Era, 1965–1968.

== Chart history ==
Chart (1966)	Peak position
Australia (Kent Music Report)	98
U.S. Billboard Hot 100	30
U.S. Cash Box Top 100	21

== Cover versions ==
"Night Time" was covered by Dr. Feelgood on their 1978 album Private Practice, by Jayne County on her 1980 live album Rock 'n' Roll Resurrection, by The J. Geils Band on their 1980 album Love Stinks, by George Thorogood and the Destroyers on their 1980 album More George Thorogood and the Destroyers, and by Bauhaus in a 1983 BBC session, later released on the 1989 album Swing the Heartache: The BBC Sessions. “Night Time” was also used in a Michelob Lite TV spot in 1987/1988 by Joe Jackson.
