= Nadine (album) =

Studio album by George Thorogood and the Destroyers
- Released: 1986
- Recorded: 1974
- Genre: Blues rock; boogie rock
- Length: 27:38
- Label: MCA
- Producer: Danny Lipman

George Thorogood and the Destroyers chronology
Maverick (1985)	Nadine (1986)	Born to Be Bad (1988)

Professional ratings
Review scores
Source	Rating
Allmusic	3/5 stars

Nadine is an album by George Thorogood and the Destroyers that was released in 1986. These songs are Thorogood's first recordings, made in 1974.

== Release ==
MCA Records released Nadine in 1986. Although it was marketed as a new release, it is a CD repackaging of "Better Than the Rest".

== Track listing ==
No.	Title	Writer(s)	Length
1.	"Nadine"	Chuck Berry	4:04
2.	"My Way"	Jerry Capehart, Eddie Cochran	1:59
3.	"You're Gonna Miss Me"	Eddie "Guitar Slim" Jones	2:16
4.	"Worried About My Baby"	Camps, J. Tolbert, A. Tucker	3:31
5.	"In the Night Time"	Michael Henderson, Sylvester Rivers	3:11
6.	"I'm Ready"	Willie Dixon	2:47
7.	"My Weakness"	V. Smith, N. Wilson	2:27
8.	"Goodbye Baby"	Joe Josea, Sam Ling, Jules Taub	3:10
9.	"Huckle Up Baby"	Bernard Besman, John Lee Hooker	2:26
10.	"Howlin' for My Darlin'"	Dixon, Howlin' Wolf	3:24
Total length:			27:38
