= Live (George Thorogood and the Destroyers album) =

Live album by George Thorogood and the Destroyers
- Released: August 13, 1986
- Recorded: May 23, 1986
- Venues: Cincinnati Gardens, Ohio
- Genres: Blues rock; boogie rock; hard rock
- Length: 53:34
- Label: EMI America Records
- Producers: Terry Manning; The Delaware Destroyers

George Thorogood and the Destroyers chronology
Maverick (1985)	Live (1986)	Born to Be Bad (1988)

Singles from Live
- 1. "Reelin' and Rockin'" Released: July 23, 1986; 2. "Night Time" Released: October 1, 1986

Live is the first live album by American blues rock band George Thorogood & the Destroyers. It was released in 1986 by the label EMI America Records. The album was recorded on May 23, 1986 at the Cincinnati Gardens, Ohio.

Live is one of the Destroyers' best-selling albums, selling more than one million copies. The album is also one of the Destroyers' best performing, peaking at No. 33 on the Billboard 200 chart, and spending 42 weeks on the chart.

== Release ==
EMI America released Live on August 13, 1986. The album debuted at No. 81, and peaked at No. 33 on the Billboard 200 chart. The album was certified platinum by the Recording Industry Association of America (RIAA) on April 19, 1995.

Professional ratings
Review scores
Source	Rating
AllMusic	2/5 stars
Billboard	(unrated)
The Rolling Stone Jazz & Blues Album Guide	3/5 stars
The Virgin Encyclopedia of the Blues	2/5 stars

"Reelin' and Rockin'" was released as a single on July 23, 1986. It peaked at No. 11 on the Mainstream Rock chart. "Night Time" was also released as a single on October 1.

== Track listing ==
Side one
No.	Title	Writer(s)	Length
1.	"Who Do You Love?"	Ellas McDaniel	5:37
2.	"Bottom of the Sea"	McKinley Morganfield	3:27
3.	"Night Time"	Bob Feldman, Jerry Goldstein, Richard Gottehrer	5:29
4.	"I Drink Alone"	George Thorogood	4:35
5.	"One Bourbon, One Scotch, One Beer"	John Lee Hooker	6:06

Side two
No.	Title	Writer(s)	Length
1.	"Alley Oop"	Dallas Frazier	3:58
2.	"Madison Blues"	Elmore James	5:38
3.	"Bad to the Bone"	George Thorogood	5:35
4.	"The Sky Is Crying"	Elmore James	8:28
5.	"Reelin' and Rockin'"	Chuck Berry	5:10
Total length:			53:34

== Personnel ==
- George Thorogood – slide guitar, vocals
- Bill Blough – bass, vocals
- Hank "Hurricane" Carter – saxophone, percussion
- Steve Chrismar – rhythm and lead guitar
- Jeff Simon – drums

== Charts ==
Weekly chart performance for Live
Chart (1986)	Peak position
Australia (Kent Music Report)	21
Canada (RPM)	30
New Zealand (RMNZ)	5
Sweden (Sverigetopplistan)	43
US Billboard 200	33

== Certifications ==
Certifications for Live
Region	Certification	Certified units/sales
Canada (Music Canada)	Gold	40,000^
United States (RIAA)	Platinum	1,000,000^

^{^} Shipments figures based on certification alone.
