= Live: Let's Work Together =

Live album by George Thorogood & the Destroyers
- Released: April 1995
- Recorded: December 2–5, 1994
- Genre: Blues rock, boogie rock
- Length: 66:15
- Label: EMI
- Producer: Terry Manning; The Delaware Destroyers

George Thorogood & the Destroyers chronology
Haircut (1993)	Live: Let's Work Together (1995)	Rockin' My Life Away (1997)

Singles from Live: Let's Work Together
- 1. "Let's Work Together" Released: 1995

Live: Let's Work Together is the second live album by American blues rock band George Thorogood & the Destroyers. It was recorded on December 2–3, 1994, at Mississippi Nights in St. Louis, Missouri, and December 5, 1994, at Center Stage in Atlanta, and released in April 1995 by the label EMI Records. "Let's Work Together" was released as a single.

The album featured guest appearances by musicians Elvin Bishop and Johnnie Johnson.

== Critical reception ==
Live: Let's Work Together received generally mixed reviews from critics.

Professional ratings
Review scores
Source	Rating
AllMusic	2.5/5 stars
The Penguin Guide to Blues Recordings	3/4 stars
The Rolling Stone Jazz & Blues Album Guide	3/5 stars
The Virgin Encyclopedia of the Blues	2/5 stars
Ultimate Guitar	8.4/10

AllMusic's Stephen Thomas Erlewine wrote "George Thorogood hasn't changed his sound at all since his first live album, the aptly-titled Live. That's not necessarily a bad thing -- his beer-stained bare-bones boogie has always satisfied his fans and it is never lacking in energy, particularly when he is stoked by the enthusiasm of a live crowd. But that doesn't guarantee that Let's Work Together Live will be a successful, enjoyable record. Quite simply, that energy does not translate to tape very well, leaving Let's Work Together curiously unengaging and somewhat distant. There are good moments scattered throughout the record, but it never pulls together into a cohesive album."

== Track listing ==
No.	Title	Writer(s)	Length
1.	"No Particular Place to Go"	Chuck Berry	5:14
2.	"Ride On Josephine"	Ellas McDaniel	6:56
3.	"Bad Boy"	Larry Williams	4:50
4.	"Cocaine Blues"	T. J. Amall	3:33
5.	"If You Don't Start Drinkin' (I'm Gonna Leave)"	George Thorogood	4:26
6.	"I'm Ready"	Willie Dixon	5:12
7.	"I'll Change My Style"	David Parker, Manuel Villa	4:39
8.	"Get a Haircut"	David Avery, Bill Birch	5:41
9.	"Gear Jammer"	George Thorogood	6:11
10.	"Move It on Over"	Hank Williams	6:08
11.	"You Talk Too Much"	George Thorogood	6:17
12.	"Let's Work Together" (with Elvin Bishop and Johnnie Johnson)	Wilbert Harrison	6:46
13.	"St. Louis Blues" (with Johnnie Johnson)	W. C. Handy	7:03
14.	"Johnny B. Goode" (with Johnnie Johnson)	Chuck Berry	5:55

== Personnel ==
- George Thorogood - guitars, vocals
- Jeff Simon - drums
- Bill Blough - bass
- Hank Carter - saxophone, keyboards, backing vocals

== Charts ==
Chart (1995)	Peak position
Australian Albums (ARIA)	139
