= No Particular Place to Go =

Single by Chuck Berry

from the album St. Louis to Liverpool
- B-side: "You Two"
- Released: May 1964
- Recorded: March 25, 1964
- Studio: Chess (Chicago)
- Genre: Rock and roll
- Length: 2:37
- Label: Chess
- Songwriter: Chuck Berry
- Producers: Leonard Chess, Phil Chess

Chuck Berry singles chronology
"Nadine" (1964)	"No Particular Place to Go" (1964)	"You Never Can Tell" (1964)

Audio sample
- file; help

"No Particular Place to Go" is a song by Chuck Berry, released as a single by Chess Records in May 1964 and released on the album St. Louis to Liverpool in November 1964 (see 1964 in music).

"No Particular Place to Go" was recorded on March 25, 1964 in Chicago, Illinois and features the same music as Berry's earlier hit "School Days".

== Lyrics ==
The song is a comical four verse story. In the first verse, the narrator is riding in his car as his girlfriend drives, and they kiss. In the second, they start to cuddle, and drive slow. In the third, they decide to park and take a walk, but are unable to release the seat belt. In the last verse, they drive home, defeated by said recalcitrant seat belt.

== Recording ==
The session(s) during which "No Particular Place to Go" was recorded were produced by Leonard and Phil Chess, and backing Berry were Paul Williams on piano, Odie Payne on drums, and Louis Satterfield on bass.

== Charts ==
Chart (1964)	Peak position
Canada (RPM Top Forty-5's)	6
Ireland (IRMA)	7
New Zealand (Listener)	2
UK Singles (OCC)	3
US Billboard Hot 100	10
US Billboard R&B Singles	10

== Certifications ==
Certifications for "No Particular Place to Go"
Region	Certification	Certified units/sales
United Kingdom (BPI)	Silver	200,000^{‡}
^{‡} Sales+streaming figures based on certification alone.

== Cover versions ==
In 1982 George Thorogood & the Destroyers included a version on their album Bad To The Bone. In 1994 it also appeared on their live album Live: Let's Work Together.
