= More George Thorogood and the Destroyers =

More George Thorogood and The Destroyers

Studio album by George Thorogood and the Destroyers
- Released: October 1980
- Recorded: 1980
- Studios: Blue Jay Recording Studio, Carlisle, Massachusetts
- Genres: Blues rock; boogie rock
- Length: 33:40
- Label: Rounder
- Producer: John Nagy

George Thorogood and the Destroyers chronology
Better Than the Rest (1979)	More George Thorogood and The Destroyers (1980)	Bad to the Bone (1982)

Singles from More George Thorogood and The Destroyers
- 1. "Bottom of the Sea" Released: October 1980; 2. "House of Blue Lights" Released: 1980; 3. "Night Time" / "Kids From Philly" Released: 1980 (UK); 4. "I'm Wanted" Released: 1981

More George Thorogood and the Destroyers is the fourth studio album by American blues rock band George Thorogood and the Destroyers. It was released in 1980 by the label Rounder Records. Most CD reissues refer to the album as I'm Wanted.

More George Thorogood and the Destroyers was the first Destroyer's album to feature saxophonist Hank "Hurricane" Carter.

== Background and recording ==
More George Thorogood was recorded at Blue Jay Recording Studio in Massachusetts. This was the first Destroyer's album to feature saxophonist Hank "Hurricane" Carter. The album was recorded in just a day.

== Release ==
Rounder Records released More George Thorogood and the Destroyers in October 1980. 200,000 copies of the album were pre-ordered by October 1980. The album debuted at No. 179, and peaked at No. 68 on the Billboard 200 chart.

"Bottom of the Sea" was the lead single from the album, "I'm Wanted" was also released as a single. "Night Time" was released as a single in the UK.

== Critical reception ==
More George Thorogood and the Destroyers received mixed reviews from critics.

Professional ratings
Review scores
Source	Rating
AllMusic	3.5/5 stars
Billboard	(unrated)
The Rolling Stone Jazz & Blues Album Guide	3/5 stars
The Virgin Encyclopedia of the Blues	2/5 stars

A Cashbox reviewer wrote "Thorogood, with his raunchy old blues master vocals and raw live guitar sound, treats classics by Elmore James and Willie Dixon as though they were meant for him." AllMusic`s Ron Wynn said "While this wasn't quite as memorable as his earlier dates, George Thorogood still had the hunger that fueled his breakout sessions."

== Track listing ==
=== Original release ===
Side one
No.	Title	Writer(s)	Length
1.	"I'm Wanted"	Willie Dixon	4:05
2.	"Kids from Philly"	George Thorogood	2:30
3.	"One Way Ticket"	John Lee Hooker	4:33
4.	"Bottom of the Sea"	McKinley Morganfield	3:30
5.	"Night Time"	Bob Feldman, Jerry Goldstein, Richard Gottehrer	3:03

Side two
No.	Title	Writer(s)	Length
1.	"Tip on In"	James Moore	3:01
2.	"Goodbye Baby"	Elmore James	4:18
3.	"House of Blue Lights"	Don Raye, Freddie Slack	3:03
4.	"Just Can't Make It"	Hound Dog Taylor	3:25
5.	"Restless"	Carl Perkins	3:14
Total length:			33:40

== Personnel ==
=== Musicians ===
- George Thorogood – vocals, guitar
- Billy Blough – bass guitar
- Jeff Simon – drums
- Hank Carter – saxophone

=== Technical ===
- John Nagy – producer, engineer
- Paul Mufson – assistant engineer
- Dave Crawford – mastering
- Susan Marsh – design
- David Gahr – photography (front cover)
- Rainer Schutz – photography (back cover - color)
- David Wilds – photography (back cover - b/w)

== Charts ==
Chart (1980)	Peak position
Australia (Kent Music Report)	97
Canada (RPM)	30
US Billboard 200	68
