= 30th Anniversary Tour: Live =

Live album by George Thorogood and the Destroyers
- Released: October 19, 2004
- Recorded: May 4, 2004
- Genre: Blues rock, Boogie rock
- Length: 66:15
- Label: Eagle

George Thorogood and the Destroyers chronology
Ride 'Til I Die (2003)	30th Anniversary Tour: Live (2004)	The Hard Stuff (2006)

Singles from 30th Anniversary Tour: Live
- 1. "Merry Christmas Baby" Released: December 8, 2009

Professional ratings
Review scores
Source	Rating
AllMusic	3.5/5 stars

30th Anniversary Tour: Live is the fourth live album by George Thorogood and the Destroyers. It was recorded on May 4, 2004, at the Royal Concert Hall in Nottingham, England, and released on October 19, 2004, on the Eagle Records label. The performance was also released on DVD, and as a CD/DVD collectors' edition.

== Track listing ==
No.	Title	Writer(s)	Length
1.	"Long Gone"	George Thorogood	4:32
2.	"Who Do You Love?"	Ellas McDaniel	7:01
3.	"Night Time"	Feldman, Goldstein, Gottehrer	7:09
4.	"I Drink Alone"	Thorogood	5:20
5.	"One Bourbon, One Scotch, One Beer"	John Lee Hooker	11:20
6.	"Don't Let the Bossman Get You Down"	Elvin Bishop	3:06
7.	"The Sky Is Crying"	Elmore James	5:50
8.	"Sweet Little Lady"	Thorogood, Suhler	3:47
9.	"Greedy Man"	Shaw	3:26
10.	"Bad to the Bone"	Thorogood	6:33
11.	"The Fixer"	Fleming, Tom Hambridge	4:57
12.	"That's It, I Quit"	Nick Lowe	2:54
13.	"Rockin' My Life Away"	Vickery	7:50

In addition to the above, the DVD of the concert offers two extra performances: "Move It On Over" and "You Talk Too Much". The DVD bonus features include a promotional video for "American Made", and acoustic performances of "Ride 'Til I Die" and "Merry Christmas Baby".

The performance of "Merry Christmas Baby" was also released as a single.
