= Who Do You Love? =

Who Do You Love? may refer to:

== Music ==
=== Albums ===
- Who Do You Love? (album), by King Adora

=== Songs ===
- "Who Do You Love" (Bernard Wright song), 1985
- "Who Do You Love?" (Bo Diddley song), 1956
- "Who Do You Love" (Haddaway song), 1998
- "Who Do You Love" (Marianas Trench song), 2015
- "Who Do You Love?" (Ryan O'Shaughnessy song), 2013
- "Who Do You Love" (The Chainsmokers song), 2019
- "Who Do You Love?" (YG song), 2014
- "Who Do U Love", 1996 song by Deborah Cox
- "Who Do U Love?" (Monsta X song), 2019
- "Who Do U Love", 1998 song by Love Inc.
- "Who Do You Love?", 1908 song by Collins & Harlan
- "Who Do You Love", 1964 song by the Sapphires
- "Who Do You Love", 1975 song by Ian Hunter
- "Who Do You Love", 1990 song by Whitney Houston from I'm Your Baby Tonight
- "Who Do You Love", 1992 song by Audio Adrenaline from Audio Adrenaline
- "Who Do You Love", 2000 song by the Moffatts from Submodalities

== Other uses ==
- Who Do You Love? (film), a 2008 film biopic of American record producer Leonard Chess

== See also ==
- Who Do Ya (Love), a 1978 album by KC and the Sunshine Band
- "Who You Love", a 2013 song by John Mayer
