= Better Than the Rest =

Studio album by George Thorogood
- Released: September 1979
- Recorded: September 1974
- Genres: Blues rock; boogie rock
- Length: 27:38
- Label: MCA
- Producer: Danny Lipman

George Thorogood chronology
Move It On Over (1978)	Better Than the Rest (1979)	More George Thorogood and the Destroyers (1980)

Singles from Better Than the Rest
- 1. "My Way" / "You're Gonna Miss Me" Released: October 1979; 2. "In the Night Time" Released: 1979

Better Than the Rest is the third album of songs by American blues rock band George Thorogood and the Destroyers, recorded in 1974 and released in September 1979. The album peaked at No. 78 on the Billboard Top LPs chart.

== Background and recording ==
In September 1974 Thorogood and the Destroyers recorded a 20 songs demo, with producer Danny Lipman. At the time, Thorogood was in a production agreement with Lipman, and wasn't signed to any label.

After the Destroyers released Move It On Over, MCA Records, who bought the demos from Danny Lipman, wanted to release ten of those songs as Better Than the Rest on July 6, and the other ten later that year. Thorogood wasn't happy with this and threatened legal action if MCA released the album. The agreement between Thorogood and Lipman stated that if Lipman failed to find a label to release the tapes within nine months of their recording, the tapes couldn't be released without Thorogood's consent. Because of this agreement, MCA claimed that the tapes were recorded in 1978 during the same sessions as Move It On Over. MCA also admitted that the album was being released without Thorogood's approval.

The matter was settled out of court, and they reached an agreement where only Better Than the Rest was released.

According to Thorogood, the band didn't have anything to do with Better Than the Rest, as they didn't own the masters to the album.

== Release ==
MCA Records released Better Than the Rest in September 1979. The album peaked at No. 78 on the Billboard Top LPs & Tape chart. "My Way", c/w "You're Gonna Miss Me" was released as a single in October 1979.

Professional ratings
Review scores
Source	Rating
AllMusic	3/5 stars
DownBeat	2/5 stars
The Rolling Stone Album Guide	2/5 stars
The Virgin Encyclopedia of the Blues	2/5 stars

=== CD reissue ===
In 1986, the songs from this album were released on compact disc with the title Nadine, in a different track order. Better Than The Rest itself was never reissued on CD.

== Track listing ==
Side one
No.	Title	Writer(s)	Length
1.	"In the Night Time"	Michael Henderson, Sylvester Rivers	3:08
2.	"I'm Ready"	Willie Dixon	2:46
3.	"Goodbye Baby"	Joe Josea, Jules Taub, Sam Ling	3:08
4.	"Howlin for My Darling"	Dixon, Howlin' Wolf	3:24
5.	"My Weakness"	Vetter Smith, N. Wilson	2:26

Side two
No.	Title	Writer(s)	Length
1.	"Nadine"	Chuck Berry	4:03
2.	"My Way"	Eddie Cochran, Jerry Capehart	1:56
3.	"You're Gonna Miss Me"	Eddie Jones	2:14
4.	"Worried About My Baby"	Howlin' Wolf	3:29
5.	"Huckle Up Baby"	Bernard Besman, John Lee Hooker	2:24
Total length:			27:38

== Personnel ==
Musicians

- George Thorogood – vocals, guitar
- Michael Levine – bass guitar
- Jeff Simon – drums, backing vocals

Technical

- Danny Lipman – producer
- Joe Chicarrelli – engineer

== Charts ==
Chart (1979)	Peak position
US Top LPs & Tape (Billboard)	78
Canada (RPM Magazine)	71
New Zealand (RMNZ)	43
