= Born to Be Bad (album) =

1988 American blues rock album by George Thorogood and the Destroyers

Studio album by George Thorogood and the Destroyers
- Released: January 13, 1988 (US); February 1988 (UK)
- Recorded: August 1987
- Studios: Ardent Studios; Alpha Sound, Memphis, Tennessee
- Genres: Blues rock; boogie rock
- Length: 38:35
- Label: EMI America
- Producers: Terry Manning; The Destroyers

George Thorogood and the Destroyers chronology
Nadine (1986)	Born to Be Bad (1988)	Boogie People (1991)

Singles from Born to Be Bad
- 1. "You Talk Too Much" Released: 1988; 2. "Born to Be Bad" Released: 1988; 3. "Treat Her Right" Released: 1988

Born to Be Bad is the seventh studio album by American blues rock band George Thorogood and the Destroyers. It was released in 1988, by the label EMI America Records. The album peaked at No. 32 on the Billboard 200, and was on the charts for 24 weeks.

The Destroyers recorded Born to Be Bad in August 1987, and released it on January 13, 1988. The album received generally positive reviews from critics, and is one of the band's most successful album, selling more than 500,000 copies, and together with Maverick is their highest charting album on the Billboard 200 chart.

== Background ==
In 1982, the Destroyers signed a recording contract with EMI America, and released 3 gold albums, Bad to the Bone, Maverick, and Live. In 1987, the Destroyers embarked on a three-week club tour, after which they began recording of Born to Be Bad.

Steve Chrismar joined the band on rhythm guitar sometime before recording of the album began.

== Recording ==
Recording of the album took place in August 1987, at the Ardent Studios in Memphis, Tennessee. Terry Manning, who produced the band's previous album, returned to produce and engineer Born to Be Bad. The Destroyers also helped with producing the album.

== Songs ==
=== Side one ===
The album's opening track, "Shake Your Money Maker", was written by Elmore James. "You Talk Too Much" was the first of three songs written by Thorogood. It was the lead single from the album. A music video was made for the song. "Highway 49" was written by Big Joe Williams and later recorded by Howlin' Wolf. "Born to Be Bad" was written by Thorogood. He recalls being at a reading for a movie in 1983. As he was waiting in the lobby to be called in, a fan noticed him and mistook the name of Thorogood's 1982 song "Bad to the Bone" as "Born to Be Bad". Thorogood liked "Born to Be Bad" and later wrote the song. The song was also released as a single. "You Can't Catch Me" is a Chuck Berry cover.

=== Side two ===
Side two of the album begins with "I'm Ready", a cover of a Fats Domino song. "Treat Her Right" is a song written and first released by Roy Head. According to Thorogood, their record label wanted them to record covers of old hits, and chose this song. It was released as a single, and a music video was made for it, which featured Head. "I Really Like Girls" was written by Thorogood, but first recorded by Hank Williams Jr. on his 1985 album Five-O. Williams decided to record the song after hanging around with Thorogood during the making of the music video for Williams' song "All My Rowdy Friends Are Coming Over Tonight". "Smokestack Lightning" is a blues song written by Howlin' Wolf. "I'm Movin' On" is a country standard written by Hank Snow.

== Release ==
EMI America released Born to Be Bad on January 13, 1988. The album debuted at No. 84, and peaked at No. 32 on the Billboard 200, and spent 24 weeks on the chart. The album was certified gold by the Recording Industry Association of America (RIAA) on April 8, 1988.

Three singles were released from the album. "You Talk Too Much", written by Thorogood, was the lead single from the album. The song debuted at number 17, and peaked at number 4 on the Hot Mainstream Rock Tracks chart. "Born to Be Bad", also written by Thorogood, debuted at number 34, and peaked at number 3 on the Hot Mainstream Rock Tracks chart. "Treat Her Right" was the third single. It debuted at number 43, and peaked at number 39 on the same chart. Music videos were made for "You Talk Too Much" and "Treat Her Right".

== Critical reception ==
Born to Be Bad received generally positive reviews from critics.

Professional ratings
Review scores
Source	Rating
AllMusic	2.5/5 stars
The Great Rock Discography	5/10
Music & Media	(unrated)
The Penguin Guide to Blues Recordings	3/4 stars
The Virgin Encyclopedia of the Blues	2/5 stars

A Cash Box reviewer called the album a "polished package of their inimitable rock and roll", and that the album is "chock-full of AOR gems". Steve Newton of The Georgia Straight wrote "When it comes to party-time, rockin' blues, few people deliver with the same kind of no-frills, honest urgency as George Thorogood. Well, the bad-ass guitar ace from Wilmington, Delaware, has come through with another sturdy collection of originals and classic blues covers that should keep his constantly growing legion of fans more than satisfied." Billboard magazine wrote that "there isn't much that's new or original in the music", but that "Thorogood's hearty performance style and cadre of loyal fans, should win him a slot high on the charts." The Gavin Report's Ron Fell says "The album at hand is mostly a collection of high-spirited covers of rockin' blues from Memphis and beyond. And they're not just covers. They lend integrity to the oldies by toughening them up, not by making them contemporary." RPM writes "A potent combination of originals and covers, the album's an uncompromising example of a man sticking to his roots, complimenting the masters emotion with is own firebrand enthusiasm."

George Thorogood considers Born to Be Bad and Ride 'Til I Die the best albums he ever made.

== Track listing ==
Side one
No.	Title	Writer(s)	Length
1.	"Shake Your Money Maker"	Elmore James	3:29
2.	"You Talk Too Much"	George Thorogood	4:35
3.	"Highway 49"	Big Joe Williams	5:46
4.	"Born to Be Bad"	Thorogood	3:34
5.	"You Can't Catch Me"	Chuck Berry	3:45

Side two
No.	Title	Writer(s)	Length
1.	"I'm Ready"	Sylvester Bradford, Fats Domino, Al Lewis	3:20
2.	"Treat Her Right"	Roy Head, Gene Kurtz	3:32
3.	"I Really Like Girls"	Thorogood	3:49
4.	"Smokestack Lightning"	Howlin' Wolf	3:15
5.	"I'm Movin' On"	Hank Snow	3:58
Total length:			38:35

== Personnel ==
The following personnel are credited on the album:

=== Musicians ===
- George Thorogood – vocals, rhythm guitar, slide guitar
- Billy Blough – bass guitar
- Jeff Simon – drums
- Hank Carter – saxophone, backing vocals
- Steve Chrismar – lead guitar

=== Technical ===
- Delaware Destroyers – producer
- Terry Manning – producer, engineer, mixing
- Ken Irwin – production assistant
- Bob Ludwig – mastering
- Henry Marquez – art direction
- Moshe Brakha – photography
- John Tobler – liner notes

== Charts ==
Chart (1985)	Peak position
Australia (ARIA)	30
Canada (RPM)	14
New Zealand (RMNZ)	2
Sweden (Sverigetopplistan)	42
US Billboard 200	32

== Certifications ==
Certifications for Born to Be Bad
Region	Certification	Certified units/sales
Canada (Music Canada)	Platinum	80,000^{^}
New Zealand (RMNZ)	Gold	7,500^{^}
United States (RIAA)	Gold	500,000^{^}

^{^} Shipments figures based on certification alone.
