= As the Years Go Passing By =

Blues standard

"As the Years Go Passing By" is a song penned by Peppermint Harris for Fenton Robinson, who first recorded it in 1959 on Duke Records, Duke #312. Flamboyant pianist James Booker also played on the session. It is credited to have been written by 'Deadric Malone' (a pseudonym of Don Robey), owner of Duke, which was a customary practice for some producers and label owners at that time. It was originally titled "As the Years Go By" The songs deals with a man who asks a woman not to leave him, as his love will continue for her as the years go passing by.

Robinson rerecorded the song for his Grammy nominated 1977 album I Hear Some Blues Downstairs, which was inducted into the Blues Hall of Fame in 2010.
