= Roy Head =

American singer (1941–2020)

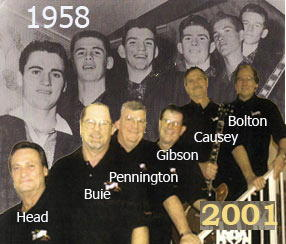
- Roy Kent Head and the Traits

Background information
- Born: Roy Kent Head; January 9, 1941; Three Rivers, Texas, U.S.
- Died: September 21, 2020 (aged 79) Porter, Texas, U.S.
- Genres: Blue-eyed soul, country, Rhythm and blues, rock and roll, rockabilly
- Occupations: Singer, songwriter
- Years active: 1958–2019
- Label: Back Beat

Roy Kent Head (January 9, 1941 – September 21, 2020) was an American singer, best known for his hit song "Treat Her Right".

Head and fellow high school student Tommy Bolton founded musical group The Traits in 1957, with the band, billed as Roy Head and the Traits, scoring the international hit "Treat Her Right" in 1965. Head later enjoyed a successful solo career with several hits on the country and western charts between 1975 and 1985. During his career of some 50 years, Head performed in several different musical genres and recorded for an array of record labels, some too small to provide national marketing and distribution. Roy Head and the Traits held reunions in 2001 and 2007 and were inducted into the Rockabilly Hall of Fame in 2007.

== Career ==
Roy Kent Head was born in Three Rivers, Texas in 1941 and moved to San Marcos in 1955. In 1957 at the age of 16, Head – along with San Marcos native Tommy Bolton – formed a musical group known as The Traits (aka 'Roy Head and The Traits') who would perform and record for the next nine years. The original group consisted of fellow high school students Head (vocals), Bolton (rhythm guitar) (1941–2003), Gerry Gibson (drums), Dan Buie (piano), Clyde Causey (lead guitar), and Bill Pennington (bass). When Causey joined the military, he was replaced by George Frazier (1941–1996) just before the band started their recording career at the Tanner N Texas (TNT) Recording Company, owned by Bob Tanner and located in San Antonio. The Traits had several regional hits at TNT, with songs such as "One More Time", "Live It Up", both released in 1959, and "Summertime Love" (1960), establishing themselves in the late 1950s and the early 1960s as one of the premier teenage Texas-based rock and roll bands while playing the concert, sock hop, college and university and dance hall circuits throughout Texas. During this period, the parents of The Traits turned down Dick Clark's invitation for the boys to appear on American Bandstand, which ABC had started broadcasting nationwide from Philadelphia in 1957. At the time, all members of The Traits were minors, and some were still in high school.

In 1961 and 1962, The Traits added saxophonists David McCumber and Danny Gomez to the line-up and produced additional Texas/regional hits from Renner Records, a label owned by Jessie Schneider of San Antonio. Renner label No. 221 and Ascot No. 2108, a subsidiary of United Artists Records, distributed The Traits' version of Ray Sharpe's 1959 "Linda Lu", with "Little Mama" by Dan Buie and Head on the B-side. Renner Records also released The Traits "Got My Mojo Working" and "Woe Woe" on label No. 229. By the time the 1962 recordings were taped and mastered at Jeff Smith's Texas Sound Studio in San Antonio for the Renner label, Johnny Clark and Frank Miller had replaced Frazier and Bolton at lead and rhythm guitars, respectively.

After attending Southwest Texas State Teachers College (now known as Texas State University or TXST) for two years, Buie, who played guitar and harmonica as well as keyboards, taught for several years before settling into public health administration, after receiving his baccalaureate degree and doing post graduate studies at The University of Texas. Tommy Bolton organized and played with other Central Texas musical groups while both he and Clyde Causey launched careers with the Department of the Treasury. Danny Gomez graduated from TXST and later earned his doctorate at Texas Tech University in Lubbock. David McCumber pursued his love of music at Sound Master's studio in Houston and then opened a real estate company in Austin. He ran the company until his retirement where he enjoyed travel with his wife Sandra until her death from melanoma cancer in 2005. George Frazier pursued real estate investment interests, and Bill Pennington followed in his mother's footsteps and become a successful owner of Pennington Funeral Home in San Marcos. Only Head and Gibson would continue with careers in performing music. The songwriting talents, and subsequent recording successes, of The (original) Traits during their first five years on a regional level were under the watchful eyes of Ms. Edra Pennington (1913–2005) and Dr. T.R. Buie (1909–2000), which would lay the groundwork for what would happen in the group's last four years.

Roy Head and the Traits signed with Scepter Records in 1964. Scepter had developed a nationwide network of independent distributors while working with The Shirelles. By this time, Gene Kurtz had replaced Pennington at bass, Kenny Williams had replaced Clark at lead guitar, Ronnie Barton's trumpet was added to the mix, and backup singer Sarah Fulcher started performing with the group. Roy Head and the Traits released a vinyl 45 featuring the vocals of Head and Fulcher on the Lori label No. 9551: "Get Back" (later released on Scepter No. 12124) with "You'll Never Make Me Blue" (re-released as "Treat Me Right").

== "Treat Her Right" ==
In 1965, the band signed with the record producer Huey Meaux of Houston, who maintained a stable of record labels. "Treat Her Right" was recorded at Gold Star Studios in Houston. Issued on Don Robey's Back Beat label, it reached No. 2 on both the U.S. Pop and R&B charts in 1965, behind The Beatles' "Yesterday". "Treat Her Right", with its blazing horns and punchy rhythm, credited to Head and bass man Gene Kurtz, established Head as a prime exponent of blue-eyed soul. By 1995, "Treat Her Right" had been covered by 20 nationally known recording artists including Jimmy Page, Bruce Springsteen, Jerry Lee Lewis, Sawyer Brown, Bon Jovi and both Mae West and Barbara Mandrell (under the title of "Treat Him Right)". Bob Dylan, Sammy Davis Jr. and Tom Jones covered it "live". Roy Head and the Traits' "Just a Little Bit" and the bluesy rockabilly hybrid "Apple of My Eye" also cracked the Top 40 in 1965. Along with Wilson Pickett's "Mustang Sally" and Steve Cropper's "In the Midnight Hour", in the successful 1991 motion picture, The Commitments. "Treat Her Right" also appeared in Quentin Tarantino's 2019 film Once Upon a Time in Hollywood. It was also recorded in 1988 by George Thorogood and the Destroyers and released the same year as a music video in which Head had an acting cameo and danced in the final chorus. "Come To Me" and "Now You See Em, Now You Don't" both in 1977 and recorded on the ABC/Dot label reached No. 16 and No. 19, respectively.

In 1965 TNT Records released the group's first "album" consisting of their music recorded for TNT and Renner Records, TLP No. 101 entitled Roy Head and the Traits, which was also distributed by the New York-based Scepter Records. Goldmine Album Price Guide offers a 'counterfeit caution' when buying this album. The original from TNT did not include the song "Treat Her Right", although it is included in the more widely distributed Scepter pressing. The "counterfeit" album is also attributed to TNT, but with blue lettering on the label rather than the TNT red.

Video clips from this time period show Head to have been a dynamic and versatile eccentric dancer; there are at least three extant clips of him performing "Treat Her Right" and each one is different from the others in terms of choreography. His jumps and slides have compared to those of Nicholas Brothers. Because he was white, but his footwork included moves popular among African American gymnastic dancers, he was sometimes said to be a practitioner of "blue-eyed soul".

The chart-makers recorded and released on the Back Beat and Scepter labels spelled the end of Head's association with what has come to be thought of as the "second group" of Traits. See "Doubled Edged Sword" in The Story of Roy Head and The Traits.

== 1970s and on ==
In 1970, Roy Head released the album Same People. Later releases by Head on Dunhill and Elektra contained elements of rockabilly and psychedelic rock, but by the mid-1970s his solo career had led him to country. He signed first with Mega Records and then with Shannon Records and later on with ABC Records and Elektra Records. After releasing the 1970 cult classic "Same People That You Meet Going Up You Meet Coming Down" on Dunhill Records, Head's music reached the U.S. country music Top 100 24 times by the mid-1980s, while landing three Top 20 hits: "The Most Wanted Woman in Town", (1975) "Come To Me" and "Now You See Em, Now You Don't" both in 1977 and recorded on the ABC/Dot label reaching No. 16 and No. 19, respectively.

The earliest blues-styled, and rockabilly-styled recordings of The Traits, were primarily written in a collaboration between Bolton, Buie, Gibson, and Roy Head. Joe "King" Carrasco had a hit covering The Traits' "One More Time" and released it on Hannibal Records and Stiff Records (UK) in 1981–1982. Two Tons of Steel covered "One More Time" again on both CD and DVD in 2000, on Palo Duro Records entitled Two Tons of Steel – Live at Gruene Hall. Discographies reveal that much of the music originally written, composed and recorded by the Traits at TNT and Renner Records between 1958 and 1962, has been re-released over the past four decades numerous times by as many as 20 different record labels both in the U.S. and abroad.

During 1966 and 1967, when Head was working with the Roy Head Trio, The Traits independently recorded using Dean Scott on lead vocals. Scott had previously been the stand-in vocalist while Head had been away in the military. In 1967 The Traits recorded with pre-fame Johnny Winter featuring Winter's vocals and blistering guitar leads, producing a vinyl 45; "Parchman Farm" and "Tramp" on Universal 30496. No one knew that Johnny Winter was just months away from bursting upon the national scene with his appearance at Woodstock. Johnny Winter later re-released the track of "Tramp" he recorded with The Traits in his 1988 compilation album, Birds Can't Row Boats.

After the 1967 disbanding of the Roy Head Trio consisting of Head, Gibson, Kurtz, and guitarist David "Hawk" Koon, Head started pursuing his solo career.

Head is a member of the Gulf Coast Music Hall of Fame, the Texas Country and Western Music Hall of Fame and the Austin Music Awards Hall of Fame. Roy Head and The Traits held reunions in 2001 and 2007. Both reunions involved performances at Kent Finlay's Cheatham Street Warehouse in San Marcos an early musical hangout of George Strait. During their October 2007 sold-out Golden Anniversary Concert appropriately billed as "Roy Head and The Traits – For The Last Time" at Texas State University, Roy Head and The (original) Traits were inducted into the Rockabilly Hall of Fame by the Hall's Curator, Bob Timmers. Tommy Bolton and George Frazier were inducted posthumously. Musicians for the performance were Head, The Traits, Gerry Gibson, Dan Buie, Clyde Causey, Bill Pennington, and Gene Kurtz, with special guests Bill York, Don Hutchko, Don Head (1933–2009), and Roy's son, Jason "Sundance" Head.

In 2008, Head performed in Cleveland, Ohio, for The Rock and Roll Hall of Fame. Billboard has observed that Head's versatility actually worked against him since he did not fit into any specific marketing niche. His use of many small record labels also prevented his recordings from achieving national distribution.

Head was still performing and playing festivals like the Ponderosa Stomp. He released one last album, Still Treatin' 'Em Right, in 2011.

== Personal life and death ==
His son Sundance Head was a contestant on season 6 of American Idol. In 2007, Sundance signed a recording contract with Universal Motown Records. In 2016, he was the winner on season 11 of The Voice, mentored by Blake Shelton. Head died of a heart attack on September 21, 2020, at the age of 79.

== Discography ==
=== Albums ===
Year	Album	Chart Positions		Label
Year	Album	US Country	US	Label
1965	Roy Head and the Traits			TNT
1965	Treat Me Right		122	Scepter
1970	Same People			Dunhill
1972	Dismal Prisoner			TMT
1976	Head First	42		ABC/Dot
1976	A Head of His Time	45		ABC/Dot
1978	Tonight's the Night			ABC/Dot
1979	In Our Room			Elektra
1980	The Many Sides of Roy Head			Elektra
1985	Living for a Song			Texas Crude
2011	Still Treatin' 'Em Right			Music Master

=== Compilation albums ===
- Roy Head: His All-Time Favorites (1977, Crazy Cajun)
- Roy Head and The Traits: Singin' Texas Rhythm & Blues (1988, Blues Interactions, Inc. [Japan])
- Slip Away: His Best Recordings (1993, Collectables)
- Treat Her Right: The Best of Roy Head (1995, Varese Sarabande)
- Don't Be Blue: The Traits (1995, Collectables; Home Cooking [Roy C. Ames])
- The Texas Soul and Country Man: The Crazy Cajun Recordings (1999, Edsel [UK])
- Country Crooner: The Crazy Cajun Recordings (1999, Edsel [UK])
- White Texas Soul Shouter: The Crazy Cajun Recordings (1999, Edsel [UK])
- Roy Head and The Traits: Treat Her Right (1999, Dynamite)
- The Best of Roy Head and The Traits: Teeny Weeny Bit (2000, AIM [Australia])
- Head On! (2001, Music Club [UK])
- An Introduction to Roy Head (2006, Fuel 2000)
- Treat Him Right! The Best of Roy Head (2007, Fuel 2000)
- Roy Head and The Traits: Golden Anniversary (1957–2007) – Rockabilly Hall of Fame Album (2007 [re-master], D & R Sales and Service, LC, PVI)
- Voices of Americana: Roy Head (2009, Edsel [UK])
- Live It Up: Roy Head and The Traits (2010, Norton)

=== Singles ===
Year	Single	Chart Positions					Album
Year	Single	US Country	US	CAN Country	CAN	AUS	Album
1965	"Treat Her Right"		2		8	14	Treat Her Right: The Best of Roy Head
1965	"Just a Little Bit"		39		18		Treat Her Right: The Best of Roy Head
1965	"Apple of My Eye"		32			51	Treat Her Right: The Best of Roy Head
1966	"Get Back"		88				Treat Her Right: The Best of Roy Head
1966	"My Babe"		99				Treat Her Right: The Best of Roy Head
1966	"Wigglin' and Gigglin'"		110				singles only
1966	"To Make a Big Man Cry"		95				singles only
1967	"You're (Almost) Tuff"						singles only
1967	"A Good Man Is Hard to Find"						singles only
1967	"Nobody But Me (Tells My Eagle When to Fly)"						singles only
1967	"Got Down on Saturday (Sunday in the Rain)"						singles only
1968	"Broadway Walk"						singles only
1968	"Ain't Goin' Down Right"						singles only
1971	"Puff of Smoke"		96				singles only
1974	"Baby's Not Home"	66					
1975	"The Most Wanted Woman in Town"	19		7			Head First
1975	"Help Yourself to Me"	47					single only
1975	"I'll Take It"	55					Head First
1976	"The Door I Used to Close"	28					Head First
1976	"Bridge for Crawling Back"	50					Head First
1976	"One Night"	51					A Head of His Time
1977	"Angel with a Broken Wing"	57					A Head of His Time
1977	"Julianne"	79					single only
1977	"Come to Me"	16		9			Tonight's the Night
1978	"Now You See 'Em, Now You Don't"	19					Tonight's the Night
1978	"Tonight's the Night (It's Gonna Be Alright)"	28		17			Tonight's the Night
1978	"Love Survived"	45					Tonight's the Night
1979	"Kiss You and Make It Better"	74					single only
1979	"In Our Room"	79					In Our Room
1980	"The Fire of Two Old Flames"	65					In Our Room
1980	"Long Drop"	59					single only
1980	"Drinkin' Them Long Necks"	70					The Many Sides of Roy Head
1980	"I've Never Gone to Bed with an Ugly Woman"						The Many Sides of Roy Head
1981	"After Texas"	75					singles only
1982	"Play Another Gettin' Drunk and Take Somebody Home Song"	89					singles only
1982	"The Trouble with Hearts"	64					singles only
1983	"Your Mama Don't Dance"	85					singles only
1983	"Where Did He Go Right"	79					singles only
1985	"Break Out the Good Stuff"	93					singles only
