= Treat Her Right (Roy Head song) =

- German release picture sleeve

Single by Roy Head and the Traits

from the album Treat Her Right: The Best of Roy Head
- B-side: "So Long, My Love"
- Released: 1965
- Recorded: 1965
- Studio: Gold Star (Houston, Texas)
- Genre: Blue-eyed soul
- Length: 2:04
- Label: Back Beat; 546
- Songwriters: Roy Head; Gene Kurtz
- Producer: Huey Meaux

Roy Head and the Traits singles chronology
"Treat Her Right" (1965)	"Just a Little Bit" (1965)

"Treat Her Right" is a soul music song, with a standard 12-bar-blues structure. Written by Roy Head and Gene Kurtz, it was recorded by Head and The Traits and released on the Back Beat label in 1965.

== Background and recording ==
In 1965 the band signed with producer Huey Meaux of Houston. "Treat Her Right" was recorded at Gold Star Studios in Houston, with Head on vocals, Johnny Clark on lead guitar, Frank Miller on rhythm guitar, Gene Kurtz on bass, Dan Buie on keyboards, Danny Gomez and Tommy May on tenor sax, Johnny Gibson on trumpet, and Jerry Gibson on drums. In the ending instrumental choruses, Roy Head's voice is heard repeatedly shouting "HEY", and saying ad-libs including "You're too much, baby".

Issued on Don Robey's Back Beat label, the song reached No. 2 on both the U.S. Pop and R&B charts in 1965, behind The Beatles' "Yesterday." "Treat Her Right", with its blazing horns and punchy rhythm, credited to Head and bass man Gene Kurtz, established Head as a prime exponent of blue-eyed soul.

== Chart performance ==
The song reached No.2 in the United States on both the Billboard pop and R&B charts. The Beatles' "Yesterday" kept "Treat Her Right" from the No.1 spot on the Billboard Hot 100. In Canada, it reached No.8. In the UK, No.30.

Roy Head and the Traits' "Just a Little Bit" and the bluesy-rockabilly hybrid, "Apple Of My Eye" also cracked the Top 40 in 1965. However, those were only minor hits in the wake of "Treat Her Right", which is estimated to have sold over four million copies worldwide.

== Covers ==
By 1995 "Treat Her Right" had been covered by as many as 20 nationally known recording artists including the Yardbirds/Led Zeppelin legend Jimmy Page, Bruce Springsteen, Jerry Lee Lewis, Bon Jovi, British blue-eyed soul vocalist Chris Farlowe (under the title "Treat Her Good") and both Mae West and Barbara Mandrell under the title of "Treat Him Right". Even Bob Dylan, Sammy Davis Jr. and Tom Jones covered it "live".

- It was independently recorded in 1971 by country singers, Billy "Crash" Craddock and Barbara Mandrell. Mandrell's version, "Treat Him Right," flipped the genders to have the song come from a woman's perspective.
- Roy Buchanan, on his Second Album in 1973.
- Rory Gallagher, (later included as a CD bonus track) for his 1973 album, Blueprint.
- Guitarist Arlen Roth included it on his 1979 album Hot Pickups, while Vintage Guitar magazine listed it in their "Top 10 Guitar Sounds ever recorded".
- The Leroi Brothers, for their 1984 EP Forget About The Danger Think Of The Fun.
- Australian beat pop quartet Shindiggers, for their 1985 EP Beat Is Back and a different version for their 1998 LP Surf Sex Shindiggers.
- In 1988, George Thorogood recorded the track on the album Born to Be Bad and released it as a single, and as a music video in which Roy Head had an acting cameo and danced in the final chorus.
- Also in 1988, Johnny Thunders released his version on the album Copy Cats with Patti Palladin.
- It appeared on the 2001 album Sing Along with Los Straitjackets, by Los Straitjackets, featuring Mark Lindsay on lead vocal.
- Bruce Springsteen covered the song on May 13, 2014, in Albany, New York.
- Billy Gibbons and the BFG's on their 2015 album Perfectamundo
- Otis Redding, on his The Soul Album in 1966.

== Popular culture ==
"Treat Her Right" was a featured song, along with Wilson Pickett's "Mustang Sally" and Steve Cropper's "In the Midnight Hour", in the successful 1991 motion picture, The Commitments. The song was also featured in Quentin Tarantino's 2019 film Once Upon a Time in Hollywood and is included on its soundtrack.
