= Rock and Roll Christmas (song) =

"Rock And Roll Christmas"

Single by George Thorogood and the Destroyers
- B-side: "New Year's Eve Party"
- Released: 1983
- Studio: Syncro Sound, Boston, MA
- Genre: Christmas; blues rock; boogie rock
- Length: 3:21
- Label: EMI
- Songwriter: George Thorogood
- Producer: Dave Edmunds

George Thorogood and the Destroyers singles chronology
"Bad to the Bone" (1982)	"Rock And Roll Christmas" (1983)	"Gear Jammer" (1985)

Audio
- "Rock And Roll Christmas Audio" on YouTube

"Rock And Roll Christmas" is a Christmas rock song by American blues rock band George Thorogood and the Destroyers. It was written by George Thorogood as a holiday special for MTV, and released in 1983. It is the band's only Christmas song.

The song was included on Polygram's Christmas compilation album A Rock 'N' Roll Christmas, and the compilation album The Original George Thorogood.

== Release ==
"Rock And Roll Christmas" was released as a single in 1983, with "New Year's Eve Party" as the B-Side. It was released both as a 7-inch single, and a colored 12-inch single. It was produced by Dave Edmunds. The song peaked at No. 45 on the RMNZ chart in New Zealand.

== Music video ==
A music video was made for the song. It was shot in New York, and features John Lee Hooker dressed as Santa Claus.

== Personnel ==
The following personnel are credited in The Original George Thorogood liner notes.

=== Musicians ===
- George Thorogood – guitar, vocals
- Billy Blough – bass guitar, background vocals
- Jeff Simon – drums
- Hank Carter – saxophone, backing vocals

=== Technical ===
- Dave Edmunds – producer
- Carey Taylor – engineer
- David Gahr - photography
