= Move It On Over (album) =

Studio album by George Thorogood and the Destroyers
- Released: 1978 (US); November 1978 (UK)
- Recorded: February 1978
- Studio: Dimension Sound Studios, Boston, MA
- Genre: Blues rock; boogie rock
- Length: 38:07
- Label: Rounder
- Producer: George Thorogood, Ken Irwin, John Nagy

George Thorogood and the Destroyers chronology
| George Thorogood and the Destroyers (1977) | Move It On Over (1978) | Better Than the Rest (1979) |

Singles from Move It On Over
- 1. "Move It On Over" Released: 1978; 2. "It Wasn't Me" Released: 1978; 3. "Who Do You Love?" Released: 1979

Move It On Over is the second studio album by American blues rock band George Thorogood and the Destroyers. It was released in 1978 by the label Rounder Records. The album peaked at No. 33 on the Billboard 200 chart, and was on the chart for 47 weeks.

The album contains all cover material. Its title track, Hank Williams' "Move It On Over", received major FM radio airplay when released, as did the Bo Diddley cover, "Who Do You Love?". The album features drummer Jeff Simon's uncle, Uncle Meat Pennington on tambourine and maracas.

The album was recorded in February 1978, and released later that same year. Move It On Over ended up being the band's breakthrough album, receiving positive reviews from critics and being the band's first album to sell more than 500,000 copies.

== Release ==
Rounder Records released Move It On Over in 1978. The album debuted at No. 133, and peaked at No. 33 on the Billboard 200 chart. Initial orders of the album were 40,000. The album sold around 75,000 copies in its first 2 weeks, and eventually sold more than 500,000 copies.

"Move It On Over" was the lead single from the album. "It Wasn't Me", and "Who Do You Love?" were also released as singles.

== Critical reception ==
Move It On Over received positive reviews from critics.

Professional ratings
Review scores
| Source | Rating |
|---|---|
| AllMusic | 4/5 stars |
| All Music Guide to the Blues | 3/5 stars |
| Billboard | (unrated) |
| Christgau's Record Guide | B |
| DownBeat | 3.5/5 stars |
| PopMatters | 6/10 |
| The Penguin Guide to Blues Recordings | 3/4 stars |
| Rip It Up | (unrated) |
| The Rolling Stone Jazz & Blues Album Guide | 3.5/5 stars |
| The Virgin Encyclopedia of the Blues | 3/5 stars |

A reviewer for DownBeat magazine said the album "lacks by just a hair the ferocity and passion that made his debut album such a standout. Thorogood is the best new rockabilly performer to come along since the music’s golden age. It will be interesting to see how he develops." A Cash Box magazine reviewer wrote "What apparently sets George Thorogood apart from the hackneyed is a sense of flair and individuality that permeates his work and makes the familiar so devastatingly entertaining that the end result is a follow-up album bristling with a basic rock 'n' roll joyfulness unavailable anywhere else currently." A reviewer for Record World wrote that the album "should establish him as a top personality", and that "Hank Williams' title song and the old warhorse, "Who Do You Love" both suit his electric urban blues style." Ron Fell of The Gavin Report calls the album a "classic", adding "George Thorogood is a treat for sore ears."

AllMusic's Stephen Thomas Erlewine says "Gold records and radio hits came later, but this is the album where everything fell into place for George Thorogood; it's the record that defined what came afterward, and it remains one of his best." Robert Christgau writes that "It's impossible not to be charmed by Thorogood's enthusiasm, and instrumentally this band is as likable as, say, Hound Dog Taylor's HouseRockers."

== Track listing ==
=== Original release ===
Side one
| No. | Title | Writer(s) | Length |
|---|---|---|---|
| 1. | "Move It On Over" | Hank Williams | 4:19 |
| 2. | "Who Do You Love?" | Bo Diddley | 4:17 |
| 3. | "The Sky Is Crying" | Elmore James | 5:09 |
| 4. | "Cocaine Blues" | T.J. Arnall | 2:48 |
| 5. | "It Wasn't Me" | Chuck Berry | 3:54 |

Side two
| No. | Title | Writer(s) | Length |
|---|---|---|---|
| 1. | "That Same Thing" | Willie Dixon | 3:05 |
| 2. | "So Much Trouble" | Brownie McGhee | 3:15 |
| 3. | "I'm Just Your Good Thing" | James Moore | 3:29 |
| 4. | "Baby Please Set a Date" | Homesick James Williamson | 4:42 |
| 5. | "New Hawaiian Boogie" | Elmore James | 4:34 |
| Total length: | | | 38:07 |

== Personnel ==
=== Musicians ===
- George Thorogood – vocals, guitar
- Billy Blough – bass guitar
- Jeff Simon – drums, backing vocals
- Uncle Meat Pennington – tambourine and maracas

=== Technical ===
- Ken Irwin – producer
- John Nagy – engineer
- Susan Marsh – design
- David Gahr – photography (front cover)

== Charts ==
| Chart (1978–1979) | Peak position |
|---|---|
| Australia (Kent Music Report) | 51 |
| Canada (RPM Magazine) | 29 |
| New Zealand (RMNZ) | 10 |
| US Billboard 200 | 33 |

== Certifications ==
Certifications for Move It On Over
| Region | Certification | Certified units/sales |
|---|---|---|
| Canada (Music Canada) | Platinum | 80,000^{^} |
| United States (RIAA) | Gold | 500,000^{^} |

^{^} Shipments figures based on certification alone.
