= One Bourbon, One Scotch, One Beer =

Song by Rudy Toombs

"One Scotch, One Bourbon, One Beer"

Single by Amos Milburn
- B-side: "What Can I Do?"
- Released: August 1953
- Recorded: June 30, 1953
- Studio: Audio-Video Recording, New York City
- Genre: Blues
- Length: 2:50
- Label: Aladdin
- Songwriter: Rudy Toombs

Amos Milburn singles chronology
"Let Me Go Home Whiskey" (1953)	"One Scotch, One Bourbon, One Beer" (1953)	"Good Good Whiskey" (1953)

"One Bourbon, One Scotch, One Beer" (originally "One Scotch, One Bourbon, One Beer") is a blues song written by Rudy Toombs and recorded by Amos Milburn in 1953. It is one of several drinking songs recorded by Milburn in the early 1950s that placed in the top ten of the Billboard R&B chart. Other artists released popular recordings of the song, including John Lee Hooker in 1966 and George Thorogood in 1977.

== Original song ==
"One Scotch, One Bourbon, One Beer" is one of Amos Milburn's popular alcohol-themed songs, that included "Bad, Bad Whiskey" (1950), "Thinking and Drinking" (1952), "Let Me Go Home, Whiskey" (1953), and "Good, Good Whiskey" (1954). Written by Rudy Toombs, it is a mid-tempo song, sometimes described as a jump blues. Milburn recorded the song on June 30, 1953, at Audio-Video Recording studios in New York City.

The lyrics tell the story of a man who is "in a bar at closing time trying to get enough booze down his neck to forget that his girlfriend's gone AWOL, harassing a tired, bored bartender who simply wants to close up and go home into serving just one more round". The song's refrain includes:

One scotch, one bourbon, one beer (2×)
Please mister bartender, listen here
I ain't here for trouble, so have no fear
One scotch, one bourbon, one beer

Released as a single by Aladdin Records, the performers are listed as "Amos Milburn and His Aladdin Chickenshackers" after his first number one single "Chicken Shack Boogie". It became Milburn's second-to-last appearance on the record charts, when the single reached number two on the Billboard R&B chart during a 14-week stay in 1953.

Subsequently, when Milburn performed at clubs, he "incorporated three shot glasses lined up across the top of his piano [which] were filled more often than they should have been by obliging fans or by Milburn himself". Several of Milburn's contemporaries commented on his indulgence; Milburn added "I practiced what I preached". The song is included on several Milburn anthologies, such as Down the Road Apiece: The Best of Amos Milburn (1994, EMI America) and Blues, Barrelhouse & Boogie Woogie: The Best of Amos Milburn (1996, Capitol Records).

== John Lee Hooker ==
In 1966, John Lee Hooker recorded the song as "One Bourbon, One Scotch, One Beer". It is often identified as an adaptation or cover of the Toombs/Milburn song. However, biographer Charles Shaar Murray, while acknowledging Hooker's song is "derived from Amos Milburn's [song]", believes Hooker made the song his own as he had done in adapting several other earlier popular tunes. Murray calls the process "Hookerization", in which Hooker made it "into a vehicle for himself [but] edited the verse down to its essentials, filled in the gaps with narrative and dialogue, and set the whole thing to a rocking cross between South Side shuffle and signature boogie". Hooker's opening verse is more insistent than Toombs:

One bourbon, one scotch, and one beer (2×)
Hey mister bartender, come here
I want another drink and I want it now

He then adds a narrative:

And then I sit there, drinkin', gettin' high, mellow, knocked out, feelin' good
About that time I looked on the wall, at the old clock on the wall
About that time it was ten-thirty then, I looked down the bar at the bartender
He said "What do you want, Johnny?", "One bourbon, one scotch, and one beer"

Hooker's song is notated as a medium tempo blues with an irregular number of bars in 4/4 time in the key of E. It was recorded in Chicago in 1966 with Hooker on vocal and guitar, guitarist Eddie "Guitar" Burns, and unknown accompanists. The song was released on the Chess Records album The Real Folk Blues (1966). A live version with Muddy Waters' band recorded at the Cafe Au Go Go on August 30, 1966, has been described as "dark, slow, swampy-deep, and the degree of emotional rapport between Hooker and the band (particularly Otis Spann) [is] nothing less than extraordinary".

== George Thorogood ==
George Thorogood recorded "One Bourbon, One Scotch, One Beer" for his 1977 debut album, George Thorogood and the Destroyers. His version is a medley in which Hooker's version of this song is preceded by another Hooker song, "House Rent Boogie", which serves as a backstory to explain the singer's situation.

Thorogood was inspired to cover the song after hearing Hooker's version of the song on his live album Live at Cafe Au Go Go, as well as seeing Hooker play the song live in 1971. According to Hooker, "He [Thorogood] told me he was gonna do that [and] I said, 'Okay, go ahead.'" Live recordings of the medley are included on Live (1986) and 30th Anniversary Tour: Live (2004). The song was featured in the soundtrack to the professional wrestling video game WWE 2K18.

== Bibliography ==
- "One Bourbon, One Scotch, One Beer". The Blues. Milwaukee, Wisconsin: Hal Leonard. 1995. ISBN 0-79355-259-1.
- Batey, Rick (2003). The American Blues Guitar. Milwaukee, Wisconsin: Hal Leonard. ISBN 0-634-02759-X.
- Birnbaum, Larry (2013). Before Elvis: The Prehistory of Rock 'n' Roll. Lanham, Massachusetts: Scarecrow Press. ISBN 978-0-8108-8629-2.
- Dahl, Bill (1996). "Amos Milburn". In Erlewine, Michael; Bogdanov, Vladimir; Woodstra, Chris; Koda, Cub (eds.). All Music Guide to the Blues. San Francisco: Miller Freeman Books. ISBN 0-87930-424-3.
- Fahey, David M.; Miller, Jon S. (2013). Alcohol and Drugs in North America, Volume 1:A–L. Santa Barbara, California: ABC-CLIO. ISBN 978-1598844795.
- Keller, Christoph (2018). Hip Hops: Poems About Beer. New York City: Alfred A. Knopf. ISBN 978-0-415-92699-7.
- Laberge, Yves (2006). "Amos Milburn". In Komara, Edward (ed.). Encyclopedia of the Blues, Volume 2: K–Z. New York City: Routledge. ISBN 978-0-415-92699-7.
- Laredo, Joseph F. (1993). The Best of Amos Milburn: Down the Road Apiece (CD booklet). Amos Milburn. EMI America. 243 8 2.
- McMichael, Andrew (2015). Martin, Scott C. (ed.). The Sage Encyclopedia of Alcohol, Volume 1. Thousand Oaks, California: Sage Reference. ISBN 978-1-4833-2525-5.
- Murray, Charles Shaar (2002). Boogie Man: The Adventures of John Lee Hooker in the American Twentieth Century. St. Martin's Griffin. ISBN 0-312-26563-8.
- Simmons, Rick (2018). Carolina Beach Music. Jefferson, North Carolina: McFarland & Company. ISBN 978-1-4766-6767-6.
- Whitburn, Joel (1988). "Amos Milburn". Top R&B Singles 1942–1988. Menomonee Falls, Wisconsin: Record Research. ISBN 0-89820-068-7.
