= Bad to the Bone =

- US single picture sleeve

Single by George Thorogood and the Destroyers

from the album Bad to the Bone
- B-side: "No Particular Place to Go (Live)"
- Released: September 17, 1982
- Recorded: April 1982
- Genre: Blues rock
- Length: 4:52; 3:36 (single edit); 7:05 (25th Anniversary Edition)
- Label: EMI America
- Songwriter: George Thorogood
- Producer: The Delaware Destroyers

George Thorogood and the Destroyers singles chronology
"Nobody but Me" (1982)	"Bad to the Bone" (1982)	"Rock and Roll Christmas" (1983)

Music video
- "Bad to the Bone" on YouTube

"Bad to the Bone" is a song by American blues rock band George Thorogood and the Destroyers, released as a single in 1982 from the album of the same name by EMI America Records. It was written by George Thorogood.

"Bad to the Bone" became a staple of classic rock radio. It is on many compilation and live albums, and is often played live by the Destroyers. The song is often considered to be their best song.

== Writing and composition ==
George Thorogood wrote "Bad to the Bone" sometime during their 50/50 tour. It took "a few months" for Thorogood to write the song. The title of the song came from US slang of the era, according to Thorogood:

Our word in the neighbourhood was ‘bad’. “It was an alternative word, like ‘hip’ or ‘groovy’. And there was this guy in the neighbourhood who would always say: ‘Bad to death’. So I thought, hmmm… ‘Bad to the bone’. It was so common to say that word, so I knew that eventually someone was going to write this song, and it might as well be me.

— Yates, Henry (December 18, 2023). "The story behind George Thorogood & The Destroyers' Bad To The Bone". Classic Rock.

The stuttering in the chorus was inspired by Roger Daltrey in "My Generation" and Bachman Turner Overdrive with "You Ain't Seen Nothing Yet."

Thorogood first wanted Muddy Waters to record the song, but his manager declined the offer. He then asked Bo Diddley to record the song, but he did not have a recording deal at the time, so he also declined.

"Bad to the Bone" was written in open G tuning and makes use of a slide. The song adapts the hook and lyrics of Muddy Waters' 1955 song "Mannish Boy".

Chicago musician James Pobiega, who goes by the stage name "Little Howlin' Wolf", has made an unverified claim that he wrote "Bad to the Bone" and that Thorogood stole it from him.

== Recording ==
Recording of the song took place in the Dimension Sound Studios in Jamaica Plains, Boston in April 1982. Rolling Stones keyboardist Ian Stewart helped record, and played piano on the song.

== Release ==
"Bad to the Bone" was first released in 1982 as the title track to their fifth studio album, before being released as a single on September 17. The song peaked at No. 27 on the Billboard Mainstream Rock chart. Although the single was not widely popular upon its initial release, its music video made recurrent appearances on MTV, which launched a year before. The song was certified silver by the British Phonographic Industry (BPI) on April 18, 2025.

== Music video ==
The video intercuts a live performance by Thorogood and his band with footage of him entering a pool hall and challenging Bo Diddley to a game. Word of the challenge quickly spreads throughout the neighborhood, and a spectator brings in pool player Willie Mosconi from an adjoining boxing gym where he is watching a fight. Mosconi wagers a large sum of money on Diddley, and the game lasts several hours, with Thorogood gaining the advantage.

As the video ends, Thorogood attempts to sink the 8-ball but leaves it sitting at the edge of a pocket. He grins and flicks ashes onto the floor from a cigar he has been smoking throughout the game, causing just enough of a disturbance to sink the ball, and a group of children gathered outside the pool hall celebrate his victory.

The music video was directed and produced by Mark Robinson.

== Critical reception ==
"Bad to the Bone" was received positively by critics. Author Jim Beviglia opined that despite the song not landing on the Hot 100 chart, it "outstrips all other 80s songs in terms of the way it has essentially become cultural shorthand". The song eventually became their signature song, being performed at every concert.

== Use in films ==
The song has been used in many films. Heisler and Chapman both said it has been used too often, and its use in films has been characterised as having become cliche. According to Vaux, it was originally used in Christine (1983) which, according to Keiper, was actually novel at the time. This use has been praised by Muir. The song is the theme of the film and the titular car. The song was used in Terminator 2: Judgment Day (1991) to establish the image of the protagonist. According to Thorogood, 'We got a call from [Arnold Schwarzenegger] saying in his Terminator voice: "Your song. Give it to me. Now." ' The song was subsequently ubiquitous.

== Personnel ==
- George Thorogood – vocals and electric guitar
- Ian Stewart – piano
- Hank Carter – saxophone
- Billy Blough – bass
- Jeff Simon – drums

== Certifications ==
Certifications for "Bad to the Bone"
Region	Certification	Certified units/sales
New Zealand (RMNZ)	Platinum	30,000^{^}
United Kingdom (BPI)	Silver	200,000^{^}

^{^} Shipments figures based on certification alone.
