= George Thorogood =

American blues rock vocalist/guitarist (born 1950)

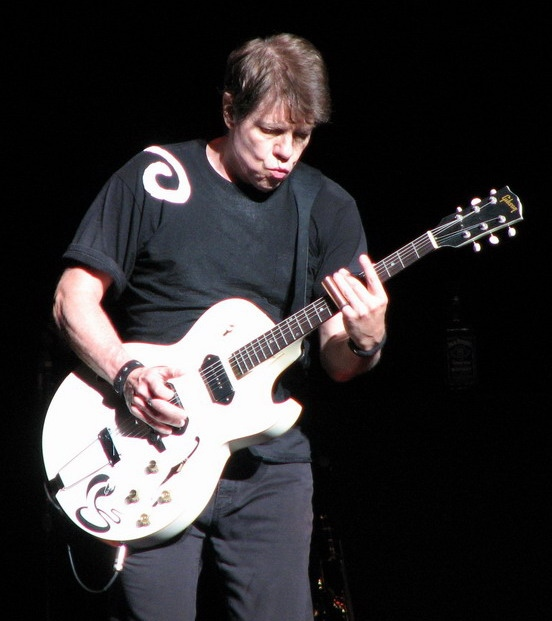
- Thorogood performing in 2006

Background information
- Also known as: Lonesome George
- Born: George Lawrence Thorogood; February 24, 1950 (age 76); Wilmington, Delaware, U.S.
- Genres: Blues rock; hard rock; boogie rock; rock and roll
- Occupation: Musician
- Instruments: Vocals; guitar; harmonica
- Years active: 1973–present
- Labels: Rounder; MCA; EMI; CMC; Eagle
- Spouse: Marla Raderman (m. 1985; died 2019)
- Website: georgethorogood.com

George Lawrence Thorogood (born February 24, 1950) is an American musician, singer and songwriter. His "high-energy boogie-blues" sound became a staple of 1980s US rock radio, with hits like his original songs "Bad to the Bone" and "I Drink Alone". He has also helped to popularize older songs by American icons, such as "Move It on Over", "Who Do You Love?", and "House Rent Blues/One Bourbon, One Scotch, One Beer".

With his band, "The Delaware Destroyers" (often known simply as the "Destroyers"), Thorogood has released over 20 albums, two of which have been certified Platinum and six have been certified Gold. He has sold 15 million records worldwide. Thorogood and his band continue to tour extensively, and in 2024, the band celebrated their 50th anniversary of performing.

== Early life, family and education ==
George Lawrence Thorogood was born on February 24, 1950, in Wilmington, Delaware. His father had emigrated from the UK to the US.

George attended Brandywine High School where he met and became friends with future drummer and bandmate Jeff Simon. Thorogood showed interest in baseball at a young age, playing semi-professional baseball as a second and first baseman. Thorogood first discovered slide guitar when a friend gave him a slide for his birthday.

== Music career ==
Thorogood began his career as a solo acoustic performer in the style of Robert Johnson and Elmore James in 1970, after being inspired by a John P. Hammond concert. He traveled to San Francisco, California and performed on the streets before a tape of one of his sets got into the hands of Bonnie Raitt's manager. He convinced Thorogood to come back to the East Coast. There he started playing with blues artists Sonny Terry and Brownie McGhee. Eventually, Robert Lockwood advised Thorogood to get an electric guitar, and in 1973, he formed a band, "the Delaware Destroyers", with high school friend and drummer Jeff Simon. The band's name comes from a piano player who played for Howlin' Wolf, and was only ever credited as "Destruction'". With additional players, the Delaware Destroyers developed its sound, a mixture of Chicago blues and rock and roll. The band's first shows were in the Rathskeller bar at the University of Delaware and at Deer Park Tavern, both in Newark, Delaware. Eventually, the band's name was shortened to just "the Destroyers".

Thorogood recorded a 20-song demo in 1974; 10 of those songs were eventually released as Better Than The Rest by MCA Records. John Forward discovered the band in 1975, and helped them secure a recording contract with Rounder Records. The band's major recording debut came with the album George Thorogood and the Destroyers, which was released on August 16, 1977. The next year, Thorogood released his next album with the Destroyers, Move It on Over, which included a remake of Hank Williams's "Move It on Over", and a reworking of the Bo Diddley song "Who Do You Love", both released as singles in 1978 and 1979 respectively. In 1980 saxophonist Hank "Hurricane" Carter joined the band. He played with the band on their fourth studio album, More George Thorogood and the Destroyers. The band's early success contributed to the rise of folk label Rounder Records.

During the late 1970s, Thorogood and his band were based in Boston. He was friends with Jimmy Thackery of the Washington, D.C.–based blues band, The Nighthawks. While touring in the 1970s, the Destroyers and the Nighthawks were playing shows in Georgetown at venues across the street from each other. The Destroyers were engaged at the Cellar Door and the Nighthawks at Desperados. At midnight, while both bands played Elmore James's "Madison Blues" in the same key, Thorogood and Thackery left their clubs, met in the middle of M Street, exchanged guitar cords and went on to play with the opposite band in the other club. The connection with the Nighthawks was extended further when Nighthawks bass player Jan Zukowski supported Thorogood's set with Bo Diddley and Albert Collins at the Live Aid concert in Philadelphia, Pennsylvania, on July 13, 1985.

Thorogood gained his first mainstream exposure as a support act for the Rolling Stones during their 1981 U.S. tour. During this time, Thorogood and the Destroyers became known for their rigorous touring schedule, including the "50/50" tour in 1981, on which the band toured all 50 US states in 50 days. After two shows in Boulder, Colorado, Thorogood and his band flew to Hawaii for one show and then performed a show in Alaska the following night. The next day, Thorogood and his band met his roadies in Washington and continued the one-show-per-state tour. In addition, he played Washington, D.C., on the same day that he performed a show in Maryland, thereby playing 51 shows in 50 days.

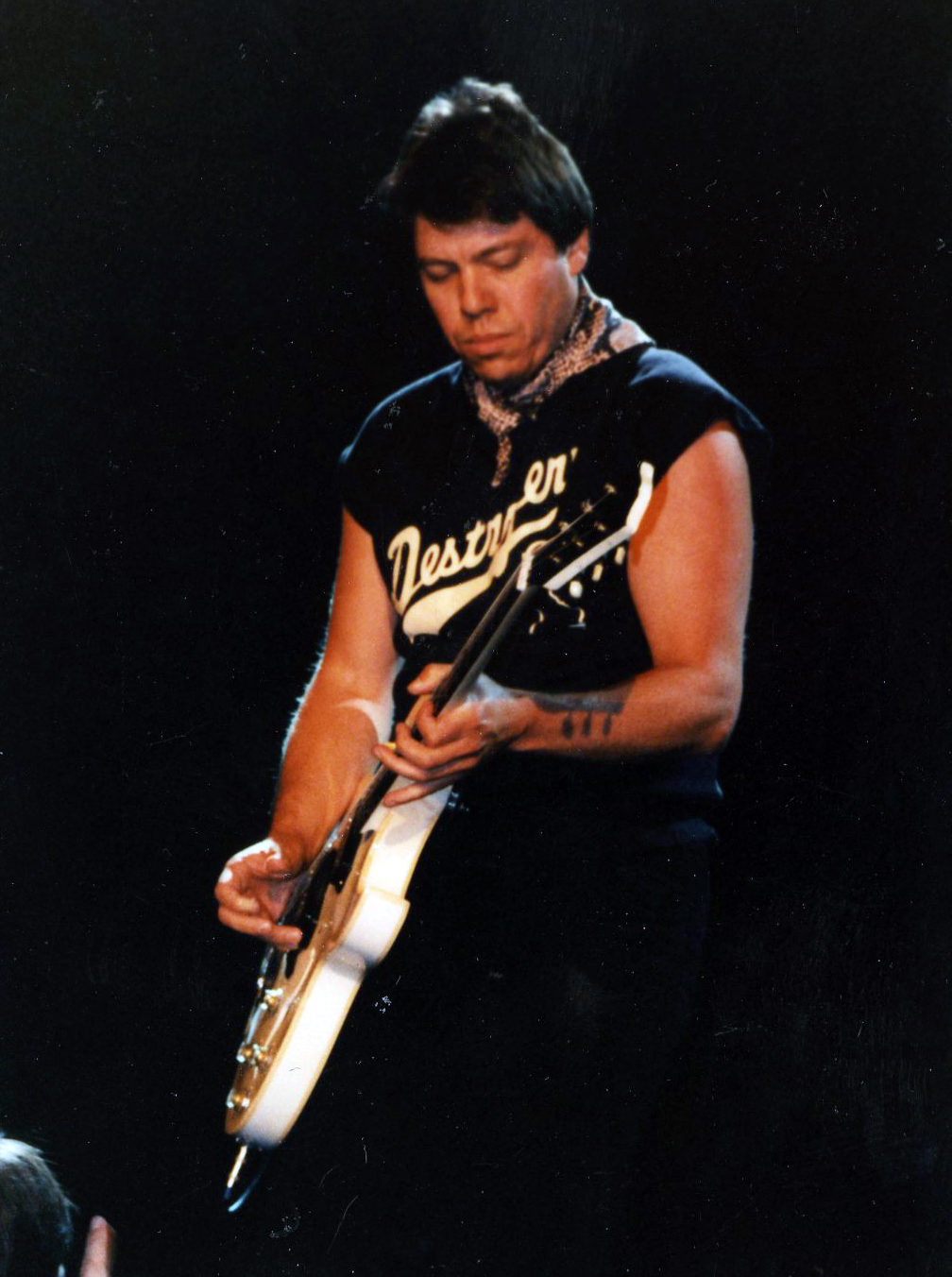
Thorogood performing at William Paterson College in Wayne, New Jersey, in April 1986

With their contract with Rounder Records expiring, Thorogood and his band signed with EMI America Records and in 1982, released Bad to the Bone, which went gold. The album's title track eventually became the band's most well-known song through appearances on MTV and use in films, television and commercials. Later that year he was the featured musical guest on Saturday Night Live (Season 8, Episode 2) on the October 2, 1982, broadcast. The next year, the Destroyers embarked on their "Around the World in 80 Days Tour", during which they toured Australia, New Zealand, Japan, Europe and the US, but the tour had to be ended early because of a riot at a festival in Spain. Later that year, the Destroyers released their only Christmas song, "Rock and Roll Christmas". It was written by Thorogood as a holiday special for MTV, with John Lee Hooker appearing in the music video. In 1984 Thorogood appeared in the music video for the song "All My Rowdy Friends Are Coming Over Tonight" by American singer-songwriter and musician Hank Williams Jr.

The Destroyers' sixth studio album was Maverick, released in January 1985. The album featured the band's only song to reach the Billboard Hot 100, a remake of Johnny Otis's "Willie and the Hand Jive", which peaked at number 63, and their concert staple "I Drink Alone". During this time Thorogood became heavily interested in country music. He intended to record a country album, but never did. On July 13, 1985, the Destroyers performed at Live Aid at the John F. Kennedy Stadium in Philadelphia. The Destroyers were only invited to play the day before after Tears For Fears cancelled. Bo Diddley and Albert Collins also played with them. In 1986, rhythm guitarist Steve Chrismar joined the band. That same year EMI America released the band's first live album, Live, in August 1986. The album was one of Thorogood's most successful, eventually being certified platinum by the RIAA. Their next studio album was Born to Be Bad, released in 1988. That summer he also toured with American musician Brian Setzer. Thorogood and the Destroyers were at the height of their popularity during the 80's, with their 4 albums with EMI selling a combined total of 3.5 million copies.

The band's popularity began to decline in the 1990s. Their eighth studio album, Boogie People, only sold around 300,000 copies, but it did contain the song "If You Don't Start Drinkin' (I'm Gonna Leave)", which eventually became a concert staple. That year he also toured with Elvin Bishop in support of Bishop's album Don't Let the Bossman Get You Down!. The next year, The Baddest of George Thorogood and the Destroyers was released, it was the band's second and final album to be certified platinum by the RIAA. Rhythm guitarist Steve Chrismar left the band before the release of their next album, Haircut. The album featured the song "Get a Haircut", which peaked at No. 2 on the Billboard Album Rock Tracks, and was the No. 1 most played song on Canadian FM radio. In April 1995, EMI released the Destroyer's second live album, Live: Let's Work Together. After the release of the album the Destroyers embarked on a summer tour, after which they began preparing material for their next album. The Destroyers' next album was 1997's Rockin' My Life Away. It was their first studio album to miss the Billboard 200 since their debut in 1977, although it was their first to chart on Billboard's Top Blues Album chart.

In 1998 EMI America dropped the Destroyers, so they signed with CMC International. The next year, they released Half a Boy/Half a Man. The album failed to chart in any capacity, and its single, "I Don't Trust Nobody", was their final single to chart, peaking at number 24 on the Billboard Mainstream Rock chart. The same year they were the featured musical guest on Late Night with Conan O'Brien on the June 8 broadcast. In July 1999 guitarist Jim Suhler joined the band. CMC International also released their third live album, Live in '99. Their next albums all charted high on Billboard's Top Blues Album chart.

George Thorogood signed a three-album deal with Eagle Records in 2002, and released Ride 'Til I Die the next year. Ride 'Til I Die was the final Destroyers album to feature Hank "Hurricane" Carter, he was replaced by Buddy Leach in August. In 2004, Greatest Hits: 30 Years of Rock was released, it was the band's final album to be certified gold by the RIAA. Eagle released their fourth live album, 30th Anniversary Tour: Live, also in 2004, and The Hard Stuff in 2006. The Destroyers toured with Buddy Guy in the summer of 2008, before returning to EMI/Capitol in 2009 to release their next studio album, The Dirty Dozen. It was their first studio album since Haircut to reach the Billboard 200, peaking at number 169. In 2011 they released their most recent studio album, 2120 South Michigan Ave., which was a tribute to Chess Record artists. In 2012, Thorogood was named one of the "50 Most Influential Delawareans of the Past 50 Years". The next year the Destroyers celebrated their 40th anniversary as a band with a national tour. Thorogood released his first proper solo album Party of One in 2017 which was his best selling album in a long time. On April 21, 2018, the Destroyers released the single "Shot Down" for Record Store Day.

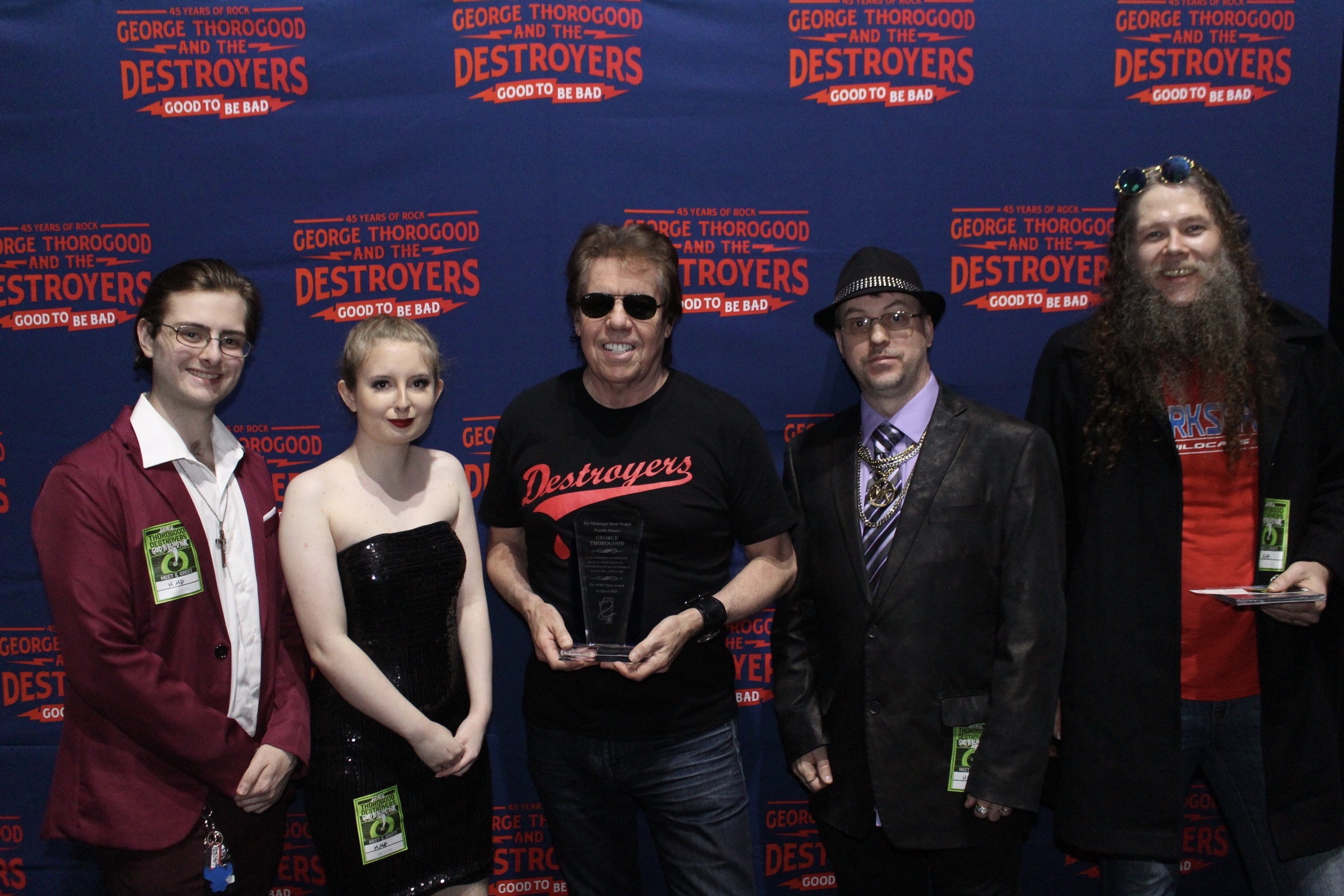
Thorogood (center) receives the MMP Music Award and Hall of Fame Honors with William Lewis IV, Alexis Paige, Joseph W. Clark, and Kevin Edwards

On March 14, 2020, Thorogood was inducted into the Mississippi Music Project Hall of Fame in Biloxi, Mississippi, and was awarded the MMP Music Award for his lifelong commitment to the music industry, by Joseph W. Clark.

Hank Carter, who served as the saxophonist for Thorogood's band from 1980 to 2003, died on September 14, 2021, at the age of 71.

On April 11, 2023, Thorogood's social media pages announced that he was seriously ill, although the nature of his illness was not disclosed. Tour dates from April 27 to May 21 were all cancelled.

In February 2025, just before Thorogood's 75th birthday, the band launched their "Baddest Show on Earth Tour", which would take them across several states and to Australia and New Zealand. A live album, The Baddest Show on Earth: Greatest Hits Live, was announced in March 2026, and was released on June 12, 2026, featuring previously unreleased performances from 1978 through 2024. The Destroyers were inducted into the Musicians Hall Of Fame at its 8th Induction Ceremony on April 28, 2026, by Dweezil Zappa.

== Personal life ==
George Thorogood married Marla Raderman on July 16, 1985. She died from ovarian cancer in 2019. They have one daughter, Rio Thorogood.

Thorogood has been a baseball fan for most of his life, playing semi-pro ball as a second baseman during the 1970s (drummer Jeff Simon played center field on the same team). He took his daughter to Chicago for her first major league game (Cubs vs. Rockies), during which he sang "Take Me Out to the Ball Game". In a 2011 Guitar World interview, he stated "I'm a Mets fan. There aren't many of us but you know, that's me."

In April 2023, Thorogood had to cancel the first leg of his 50th anniversary tour due to a serious medical condition.

== Band members ==
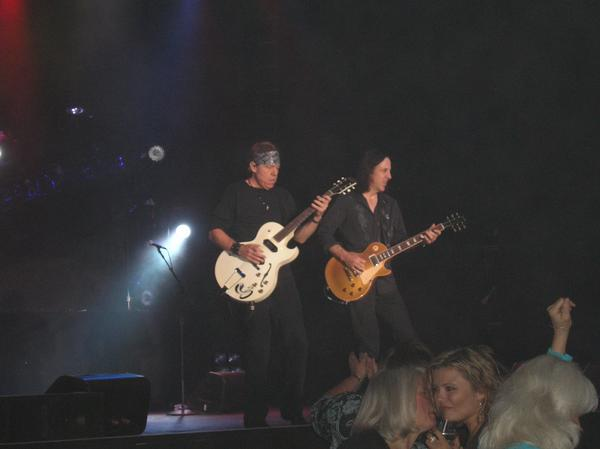
Thorogood and Jim Suhler performing in 2010

=== The Delaware Destroyers ===
- George Thorogood – lead vocals, guitars (1973–present)
- Jeff Simon – drums, percussion (1973–present)
- Billy Blough – bass guitar (1976–present)
- Jim Suhler – guitars (1999–present)
- Buddy Leach – saxophone, piano (2003–present)

=== Former members ===
- Michael Levine – bass (1973–1976)
- Ron "Roadblock" Smith – guitar (1973–1978)
- Hank "Hurricane" Carter – saxophone (1980–2003; died 2021)
- Ian Stewart – keyboards (1982; died 1985)
- Steve Chrismar – guitar (1986–1993)
- Waddy Wachtel – guitar (1997)

== Discography ==
=== Studio albums with the Destroyers ===
- George Thorogood and the Destroyers (1977)
- Move It on Over (1978)
- Better Than the Rest (1979)
- More George Thorogood and the Destroyers (1980)
- Bad to the Bone (1982)
- Maverick (1985)
- Born to Be Bad (1988)
- Boogie People (1991)
- Haircut (1993)
- Rockin' My Life Away (1997)
- Half a Boy/Half a Man (1999)
- Ride 'Til I Die (2003)
- The Hard Stuff (2006)
- The Dirty Dozen (2009)
- 2120 South Michigan Ave. (2011)

=== Solo studio album ===
- Party of One (2017)

== Concert tours ==
- The 50/50 Tour (1981)
- Bad to the Bone Tour (1982–83)
- Around the World in 80 Days Tour (1983)
- Maverick Tour (1985)
- Boogie People Tour (1991)
- Haircut Tour (1993)
- 40th Anniversary Tour (2014)
- Rock Party Tour (2018)
- Good to Be Bad Tour (2021)
- Bad All Over The World Tour (2023)
- Baddest Show On Earth Tour (2025–26)
