= Colossal Pictures =

Defunct television production company

(Colossal) Pictures
- Industry: Media
- Founded: March 6, 1976; 50 years ago
- Defunct: August 31, 1999; 27 years ago
- Fate: Closed; employee base purchased by Wild Brain
- Successor: USFX; M5 Industries; Wildbrain Entertainment
- Headquarters: San Francisco, California, U.S. New York City, New York, U.S. (1989–1996)
- Key people: Drew Takahashi; Gary Gutierrez; Japhet Asher
- Products: Animation; Stop-motion; Computer graphics Special effects Interactive media Live-action
- Subsidiaries: USFX; BIG Pictures; Noyes and Laybourne

Colossal Pictures (also styled as (Colossal) Pictures or (C)P) was an American entertainment company that developed and produced television programming, advertising, network branding, and visual effects. Colossal's work has won every major industry award, from the Clio, Emmy, and Grammy Awards to the Cannes Gold Lion and Academy of Interactive Arts & Sciences Top Honor.

== History ==
In the mid-1970s, Drew Takahashi and Gary Gutierrez were working with John Korty on animated shorts for children's programs such as Vegetable Soup. When Vegetable Soup was renewed for a second season, Korty began working on a movie, and suggested to Drew and Gary that they start their own production company. The two founded Colossal Pictures in 1976 and worked on projects such as shorts for Vegetable Soup, the opening sequence of The Grateful Dead Movie and commercials for Boise Cascade, KQED, KSAN-FM, and Gap Inc. The Boise Cascade commercial received national attention and attracted many businesses to Colossal.

In 1981, Colossal began producing dozens of network IDs for MTV, which led to the company receiving more high-profile clients including Nickelodeon, Levi's, and Coca-Cola. The following year, Gary Gutierrez launched USFX, a new division of Colossal, while he was working on The Right Stuff. Colossal started producing computer animation in 1983, when they collaborated with Pacific Data Images to produce a commercial for the Atari game Joust and a network ID for MTV. In 1986, Colossal began working with Western Images using a Quantel Harry unit, resulting in Colossal being able to create state-of-the-art computer graphics. Colossal also launched a new division, BIG Pictures, which produced television programs. In January 1989, New York City production company Noyes & Laybourne became Colossal's East Coast division. In September, Colossal began representing Pixar to produce CGI-animated commercials. As part of the deal, Colossal would receive a project and develop the storyboards, while Pixar animated the project. Colossal terminated its relationship with Pixar in 1992 when they started production on Toy Story for Walt Disney Pictures.

During the early 1990s, well-known artists like Caroline Leaf and Henry Selick were hired to direct commercials at Colossal. In 1991, Colossal began representing Sculptoons and the Brothers Quay, but their relationships with Colossal did not last very long. That same year, after Colossal's relationship with Pixar ended in 1992, Stuart Cudlitz and Brad DeGraf launched a new digital media division, which produced projects such as The Moxy Show, RoboCop: The Ride, and a Living Books game. Colossal closed BIG Pictures in 1994; that October, Colossal employees John Hays, Phil Robinson, and Jeff Fino left the company and launched a new animation studio, Wild Brain.

Earlier in 1994, Colossal created exhibits for the Rock and Roll Hall of Fame. Due to cost overruns, production delays and other problems, the museum refused to pay all of Colossal's bills. In 1995, Colossal signed a deal with Turner Feature Animation to develop animated feature films. The first intended to came out of the deal was a version of The Flying Dutchman. In March 1996, the company signed a development deal with Walt Disney Television for an exclusive development and production deal. In April 1996, Colossal laid off a third of its staff, including co-founder Gary Gutierrez, and on May 30, the company filed for Chapter 11 bankruptcy. Colossal sued the Rock and Roll Hall of Fame for $1,200,000 in damages plus $10,000,000 in punitive damages. That year, Colossal signed a development deal with the Disney Channel to produce content for the network. Colossal produced the interstitial series Frankenguy and the Professor and The Mix-Ups plus the Zoog Disney block for the Disney Channel. The adaptation of The Flying Dutchman developed by Colossal Pictures subsequently went into turnaround by Turner Pictures when news heard Warner Bros. Feature Animation is doing a similar version. After Colossal decided to restructure itself into a smaller company, consolidating all of its activities into one building in the process, they emerged from Chapter 11 bankruptcy on December 1, 1997. Jamie Hyneman, manager of Colossal's model shop, took over the facility and turned it into M5 Industries.

Although Colossal was able to sustain itself the following year with a lean work force, the company experienced a downturn in revenue at the beginning of 1999. On August 31, Colossal closed after 23 years in business. The decision was made in order to liquidate property and honor outstanding debts. Many of Colossal's employees, such as Ed Bell, Charlie Canfield, and George Evelyn moved to Wild Brain as a result.

== Work ==
=== Filmography ===
Title	Year	Notes	Client
The Grateful Dead Movie	1977	Opening sequence	Grateful Dead
Vegetable Soup	1978	"Children's Questions" (season 2)	New York State Education Department
What Is An American?	1979	Short film	Pyramid Films
The Black Stallion	1979	Title sequence and storyboards	American Zoetrope
One from the Heart	1982	Title sequence	Zoetrope Studios
The State of the Language	1983	Pilot (main titles)	Power Rector Productions
Playboy's Hot Rocks	1983	Bumper	The Playboy Channel
The Right Stuff	1983	Special photographic effects and storyboards	The Ladd Company
Flicks	1983	Animation, opening titles, and film dating	Edward R. Pressman
The Cotton Club	1984	Title sequence and photography	American Zoetrope
Seven Minutes in Heaven	1985	Title sequence	Warner Bros.
Stroh's Circle of Sports	1985	Opening sequence	Ohlmeyer Communications
The Twilight Zone	1985	Main titles and special effects	CBS Productions
A Chorus Line	1985	"Surprise, Surprise" music video	Columbia Pictures
Fast Times	1986	Main titles	Universal Television
Children of a Lesser God	1986	Title sequence	Paramount Pictures
Peggy Sue Got Married	1986	Title sequence and production	American Zoetrope
Top Gun	1986	Special effects	Paramount Pictures
The Rock 'n Roll Evening News	1986	Main titles	Andy Friendly Productions
Soul Man	1986	"Soul Man" music video	New World Pictures
Eyes on the Prize	1987	Main titles	Blackside
Gardens of Stone	1987	Title sequence	American Zoetrope
The Running Man	1987	Special visual effects	Taft Entertainment
The Serpent and the Rainbow	1988	Special visual effects	Universal Pictures
Tucker: The Man and His Dream	1988	Title sequence	Zoetrope Studios
The Completely Mental Misadventures of Ed Grimley	1988		Hanna-Barbera
Dead Pan Alley	1988	Set design for TV pilot	KQED
D-TV²	1988	Title	The Walt Disney Company
New York Stories	1989	Titles for Life Without Zoë	American Zoetrope
The All-New Mickey Mouse Club	1989	Main titles	Walt Disney Television
Lunch Box	1989	Main titles and bumpers	The Walt Disney Company
Common Threads: Stories from the Quilt	1989	Title sequence and soundstage	New Yorker Films
The Betty Boop Movie Mystery	1989	As BIG Pictures	King Features
Saturday Night Live	1990	Main titles	Broadway Video
Big Beast Quintet	1990	TV pilot	Nickelodeon
Liquid Television	1991–1994		MTV
Back to the Future	1991–1992	As BIG Pictures	Universal Cartoon Studios
Fresh Arithmetic	1991	Interstitial series	Fox Kids
The Wonderful World of Disney; Disney Family Films Presents	1991; 1994	Opening sequences	The Walt Disney Company
The Wish That Changed Christmas	1991		Children's Television Workshop
Bram Stoker's Dracula	1992	Special effects	American Zoetrope
GTV Planetary Manager	1992	Videodisc	National Geographic Society
The Great Depression	1993	Main titles	Blackside
Demolition Man	1993	Virtual reality sex scene	Silver Pictures
RoboCop: The Ride	1993	Ridefilm	Iwerks
The Moxy Show	1993–1995		Cartoon Network
Natural Born Killers	1994	Animation	Regency Enterprises
Mickey's Fun Songs	1994	Opening sequence	Walt Disney Home Video
Living Books: Ruff's Bone	1994	Video game	Random House/Broderbund
Tank Girl	1995	Animation	United Artists
Psychic Detective	1995	Video game	Electronic Arts
Æon Flux	1995		MTV
Jack	1996	Title sequence	American Zoetrope
Play-Doh Creations	1996	Video game	Hasbro Interactive
Koala Lumpur: Journey to the Edge	1997	Video game	Broderbund
Frankenguy and the Professor	1997	Interstitial series	Disney Channel
ZOOB Toons	1997	Short film	Primordial Toys
Showtime Championship Boxing	1998	Main titles	Showtime Networks
The Mix-Ups	1998	Interstitial series	Disney Channel
Super Chunk	1998	Show packaging	Cartoon Network
Zoog Disney	1998–1999	First season only; co-produced with Mondo Media	Disney Channel

Noyes and Laybourne

Formerly known as Cyclops Films (1969–1978) and Eliott Noyes Productions (1978–1983). Operated by Eli Noyes and Kit Laybourne

Title	Year	Notes	Client
Sesame Street	1971–1972; 1974	"Mad Painter" and "Sand Alphabet" shorts	Children's Television Workshop
The Fable of He and She	1974	short film	Learning Corporation of America
Pinwheel	1979–1982	animation	Warner-Amex Satellite Entertainment
Braingames	1983	pilot	HBO
About Alcohol	1984	short film	Channing L. Bete Company
MTV Top 20 Video Countdown	1984	opening	MTV
The Great Ape Activity Tape	1986		Karl-Lorimar Home Video
Colorforms Learn 'n' Play	1986	two kits	Karl-Lorimar Home Video; Scholastic Productions
Clifford's Sing Along Adventure	1986		Karl-Lorimar Home Video; Scholastic Productions
About Drinking and Driving; About Drug Abuse; About Cocaine and Crack; Young People & AIDS	1987	short films	Channing L. Bete Company
Eureeka's Castle	1989–1992		Nickelodeon
Stories to Remember	1990	"Beauty and the Beast" (animation production)	Lightyear Entertainment
Liquid Television	1991–1994		MTV
Adventures in Wonderland	1992	opening title sequence	Walt Disney Television
Top Gun: Fire at Will	1996	video game	Spectrum HoloByte

=== Music videos ===
- "Calling All Girls" (Hilly Michaels, 1980)
- "Get It On (Bang a Gong)" (The Power Station, 1985)
- "Raspberry Beret" (Prince, 1985)
- "All Around the World" (Robert Palmer, 1985)
- "Color of Success" (Morris Day, 1985)
- "Mutual Surrender (What a Wonderful World)" (Bourgeois Tagg, 1986)
- "Partners, Brothers and Friends" (Nitty Gritty Dirt Band, 1986)
- "Touch of Grey" (Grateful Dead, 1987)
- "Airhead" (Thomas Dolby, 1988)
- "Don't Worry, Be Happy" (Bobby McFerrin, 1988)
- "Good Lovin'" (Bobby McFerrin, 1988)
- "Istanbul (Not Constantinople)" (They Might Be Giants, 1990)
- "Living in the Promiseland" (Joe Cocker, 1990)
- "The Garden" (Bobby McFerrin, 1990)
- Kevin Volans: Hunting:Gathering (Kronos Quartet, 1991)
- "Steam" (Peter Gabriel, 1993)
- "Get a Haircut" (George Thorogood, 1993)
- "George of the Jungle" (Presidents of the United States of America, 1997)

=== Commercials ===
- 1-800-MUSIC-NOW (1995)
- 7Up (1985, 1995)
- ABC (1985)
- Adventure Island (1987)
- Allstate (1990–95)
- Americast
- American Express (1991)
- Ascriptin
- Atari (1983)
- AT&T (1991)
- Bankers Trust (1993)
- BellSouth
- Best Buy (1994)
- Blockbuster Video (1998)
- Bloomingdale's (1985)
- Boise Cascade (1980)
- Budweiser
- Burger King (1996)
- Cadbury
- California Federal Bank
- California Lottery (1990)
- California Milk Advisory Board (1985, 1989)
- Cap'n Crunch
- Carl's Jr. (1993)
- Cartoon Network (1992, 1998)
- CBS
- C.C. Lemon (1995)
- Celestial Seasonings (1995)
- Century Theatres
- Channel V (1994)
- Chevrolet
- Chili's
- Chuck E. Cheese (1979-80)
- Cigna (1985)
- Clorox (1985)
- Coca-Cola (1993–98)
- Cocoa Krispies (1987–88)
- Converse
- Coors Brewing Company
- Del Monte Foods (1985)
- Denny's (1997)
- DHL
- Discovery Channel (1997)
- Disney Channel (1986–90, 1992)
- Dole Food Company (1985)
- Dr. Scholl's
- ESPN2 (1993)
- Final Fantasy III (1994)
- Ford
- Fox Kids Network (1991)
- Franco-American (1996)
- Fresca (1993)
- Frito-Lay
- Gap Inc. (1981)
- General Mills (1986, 1990, 1992–94)
- Geo (1989)
- Good Guys (1993)
- GTE
- Ha! (1990)
- Haggar
- Hanna-Barbera (1989)
- Hawaiian Punch (1995)
- HBO (1984)
- Heineken (1992)
- Hershey's Kisses (1989–96)
- Hitachi (1993)
- Hi-C (1993)
- Homebase (1992)
- Home Club
- Hewlett-Packard (1992)
- Honda (1990, 1993, 1995)
- JCPenney
- Jeep (1994)
- Keds (1994)
- KGO-TV (1983)
- Kibbles 'n Bits (1989)
- Kikkoman
- KQED (1979)
- KSAN-FM (1979)
- L'eggs (1985)
- Le Méridien
- Levi's (1981, 1983–86, 1991, 1994–95)
- Liberty Mutual
- Life Savers (1990–91)
- Lifetime (1985)
- Listerine (1990–92)
- Little Caesars
- Locomotion (1996)
- Löwenbräu Brewery (1989)
- Mainstay (1995)
- MCI Communications
- McDonald's (1986–87, 1989–90)
- Miller's Outpost (1993)
- Mirinda (1985)
- Mobilink
- Motorola (1994)
- Mountain Dew
- The Movie Channel (1985)
- MSN
- MSNBC
- MTV (1981–86, 1990–93)
- Mrs. Baird's
- Nabisco (1990, 1993)
- Nature Valley
- NBA
- NBC (1986–87)
- New Visions Pictures (1989)
- Nickelodeon (1984–85, 1994–96, 1998)
- Nickelodeon Movies (1996, 1998)
- Nick at Nite (1989, 1991)
- Nike (1991–95, 1997)
- Nintendo Power (1988)
- NYNEX (1992–93)
- Ocean Spray (1984)
- Office Depot (1997)
- Old Navy (1998–99)
- Owens Corning (1996)
- Pacific Bell (1985)
- Pacific Telesis (1985)
- Partnership for a Drug-Free America (1992, 1999)
- PBS
- Pep Boys (1999)
- Pepsi (1993, 1996)
- Perrier (1995)
- Pillsbury Company (1988, 1990)
- Pizza Hut (1985, 1991–97)
- PG&E
- Playskool
- Post Holdings (1985, 1991–92, 1999)
- Procter & Gamble (1989–90)
- Prudential
- RCA (1985)
- Saab Automobile (1995–96)
- Samsung (1998)
- Schweppes (1995)
- Sega (1992–94)
- Showtime (1987)
- Six Flags (1992)
- Sprint Corporation (1998)
- Starbucks Coffee (1995)
- Straw Hat Pizza (1985)
- Southwestern Bell (1986, 1994)
- Stroh Brewery Company
- Supercuts
- Taco Bell
- Tagamet
- TBS
- Tetris & Dr. Mario (1994)
- TNT (1990)
- Tott's
- Touchstone Pictures
- Toys "R" Us (1991)
- Trident (1985, 1990)
- Tropicana (1989, 1991)
- Turner Classic Movies (1996)
- Twizzlers
- United Airlines (1996)
- Universal Studios Florida (1990)
- U.S. Navy (1994)
- Vestron, Inc.
- VH1 (1985)
- Vlasic Pickles (1989)
- Wachovia Bank
- WebTV

Noyes and Laybourne

- Apple Cinnamon Cheerios (1989)
- Bubble Yum (1992)
- Burger King (1989)
- Cigna
- Ha! (1990)
- Honeycomb (1991; with Colossal Pictures)
- IBM
- K'NEX (1994)
- Kool-Aid
- Metro-North/Long Island Rail Road
- Nickelodeon (1984–85, 1987)
- Nick at Nite (1987–88)
- Nikon (1990)
- Ripple Crisp (1994; with Colossal Pictures)
- T.G. Bearwich (1992)
