= Wan Chai (disambiguation) =

Wan Chai is a metropolitan area in Hong Kong.

Wan Chai may also refer to:

- Wan Chai (fighter) (born 1972), Burmese Lethwei fighter
- Wan Chai District, a district in Hong Kong
- Wan Chai Gap, a gap in Hong Kong
- Wan Chai station, a subway station in Hong Kong
- Wan Tsai, an area of Sai Kung Peninsula

== See also ==
- Wanzai (disambiguation)
- Wanchai Ferry (disambiguation)
