= Consumer Brands Association =

U S. consumer packaged goods manufacturers association

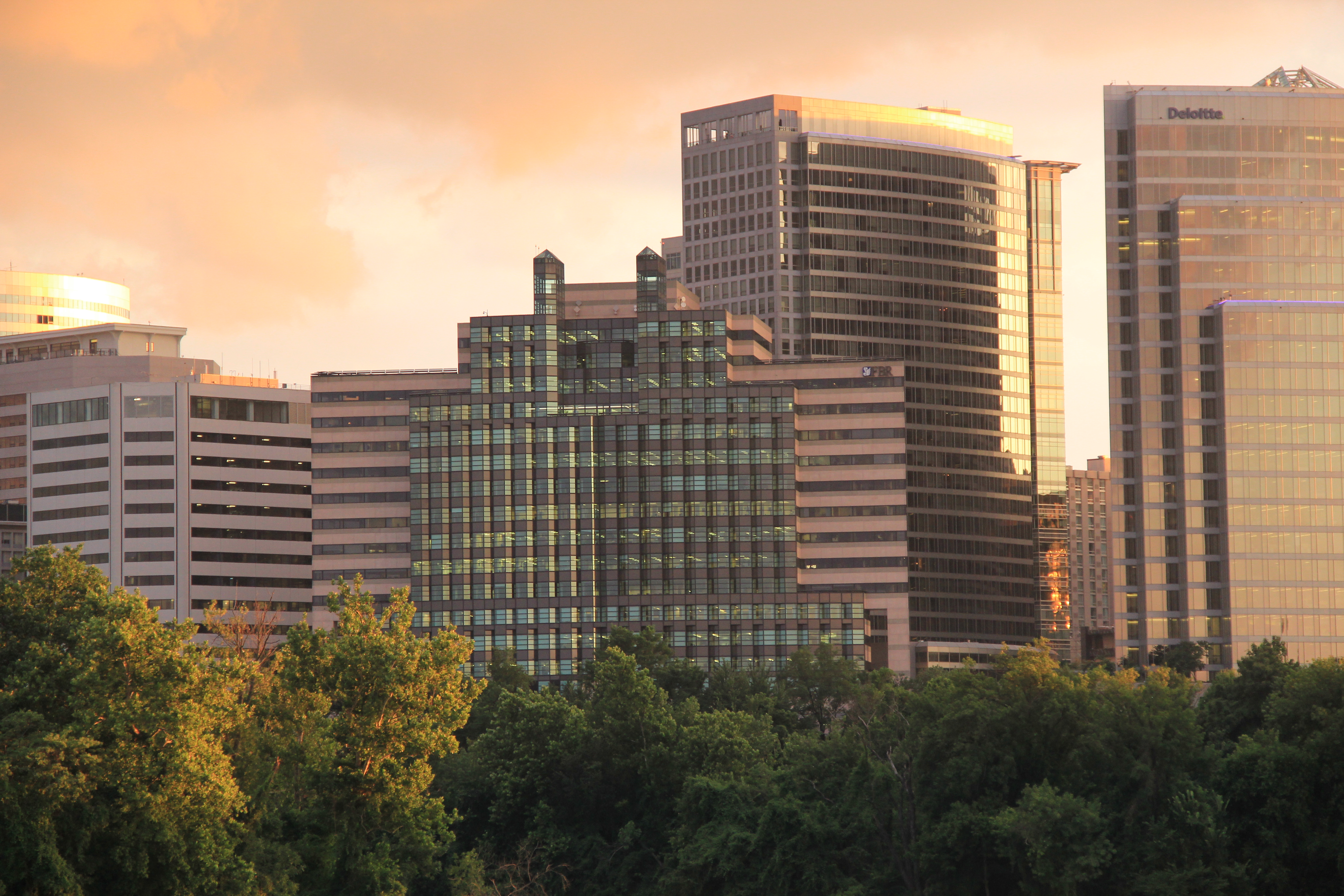
- Consumer Brands Association is headquartered at 1001 19th Street N in Arlington, Virginia (center)
- Formation: June 1908; 118 years ago
- Type: Trade association
- Headquarters: Rosslyn, VA, US
- Location: United States
- CEO: David Chavern
- Website: consumerbrandsassociation.org

The Consumer Brands Association (CBA), formerly the Grocery Manufacturers Association (GMA), is a United States-wide trade association for manufacturers of consumer packaged goods (CPG).

The CBA represents companies that manufacture food, beverages, household, and personal care products. As of December 2020, the CBA represented more than 1,700 brands. Since the CBA's rebranding in 2020, 18 companies have joined it, increasing growth by more than 30%. As of 2021, the CBA represents 73 CPG companies with nearly 2,000 brands.

== History ==
The Consumer Brands Association (CBA) was founded in 1908 as the American Specialty Manufacturers Association, which consisted of 45 food and branded-product manufacturers in New York City. It was headquartered at 2401 Pennsylvania Avenue, Washington, D.C.

Since its founding, the association has helped draft legislation such as the Federal Food, Drug, and Cosmetic Act in 1938, which gave the Food and Drug Association (FDA) regulatory authority and credited innovations, like the Universal Product Code (also known as the UPC bar code) in the 1970s. A digital disclosure tool called SmartLabel was launched in 2015.

On January 1, 2007, the association merged with the Food Products Association and formed the Grocery Manufacturers Association (GMA), the world's largest trade association representing the food, beverage, and consumer products industry (GMA/FPA).

After two outbreaks of salmonella in 2006-2007, members of the GMA made efforts "to reassess industry practices for eliminating salmonella in low-moisture products".

In 2022, the association paid $9 million to settle a lawsuit by the State of Washington, for violating the states's campaign disclosure law when the association opposed a GMO-labeling ballot initiative, Initiative 522, in 2013.

== Advocacy initiatives ==
On December 5, 2013, the GMA sent a petition to the FDA to support a new rule allowing food that is made with genetically modified organisms (GMOs) to be labeled as natural.

On March 16, 2010, First Lady Michelle Obama called on the GMA to help her with the Let's Move! campaign to reduce childhood obesity.

In 2017, the association announced plans to relocate to Arlington County, Virginia.

Several significant members, including Campbell's, Unilever, Mars, Incorporated, Tyson Foods, Nestlé, Dean Foods, Hershey's, and Cargill, had left the GMA since 2017, prompting a rebranding.

In September 2019, the association announced it would relaunch itself as the Consumer Brands Association (CBA) in January 2020. The rebranded association focused on representing the CPG industry and a new, consumer-centric agenda.

In May 2020, the CBA launched the Critical Infrastructure Supply Chain Council (CISCC), an integrated resolution of 35 or more trade associations that address short- and long-term supply chain problems.

CBA advocates on behalf of the CPG industry to Congress, state legislatures, and administration officials. The CBA's advocacy program focuses on:

- "Frictionless Supply Chains" is focused on promoting goods to consumers through frictionless supply chains;
- "Packaging Sustainability" aims to increase recyclability and redesign the current US recycling system;
- "Smart Regulations" advocates for federal regulations;
- "Trust in CPG" commits GPG to selling consumers safe, reliable products.

== Programs and initiatives ==
- Better Process Control School - The CBA hosts training for companies that produce low-acid and acidified foods, like tomato sauces, pickled products, and some pet foods. It fulfills FDA and USDA requirements in acidification, thermal processing, and container closure evaluation operations during the canning.
- Facts Up Front - A program of the CBA and Food Marketing Institute, this labeling system displays nutrition information on the front of food and beverage packages.
- Hands-on Classrooms - Provides free resources for students, teachers, administrators, and parents about food safety, systems, and processing.
- The Food Waste Reduction Alliance (FWRA) - A collaborative effort of the CBA, the National Restaurant Association, and the Food Industry Association to reduce the volume of food waste being sent to landfills, donate more food to people in need, and recycle unavoidable food waste.
- The Smart Label platform - launched in 2015, it hosts detailed information about around 80,000 products from more than 1,000 participating brands.

== Board of directors ==
Chair

- Jeff Harmening, Chairman and chief executive officer, General Mills, Inc.

Vice-Chair

- Carolyn Tastad, Group President - North American and Chief Sales Officer, Procter & Gamble

Treasurer/Secretary

- William B. Cyr, CEO of Fresh Pet, Inc.

=== Notable members ===
- Beth Ford, President, and chief executive officer, Land O'Lakes, Inc.
- David Chavern, President and CEO, Consumer Brands Association
- Linda Rendle, chief executive officer, The Clorox Company
- Mark Smucker, President, and chief executive officer, The J. M. Smucker Company
