= Airfone =

Air-ground radiotelephone service

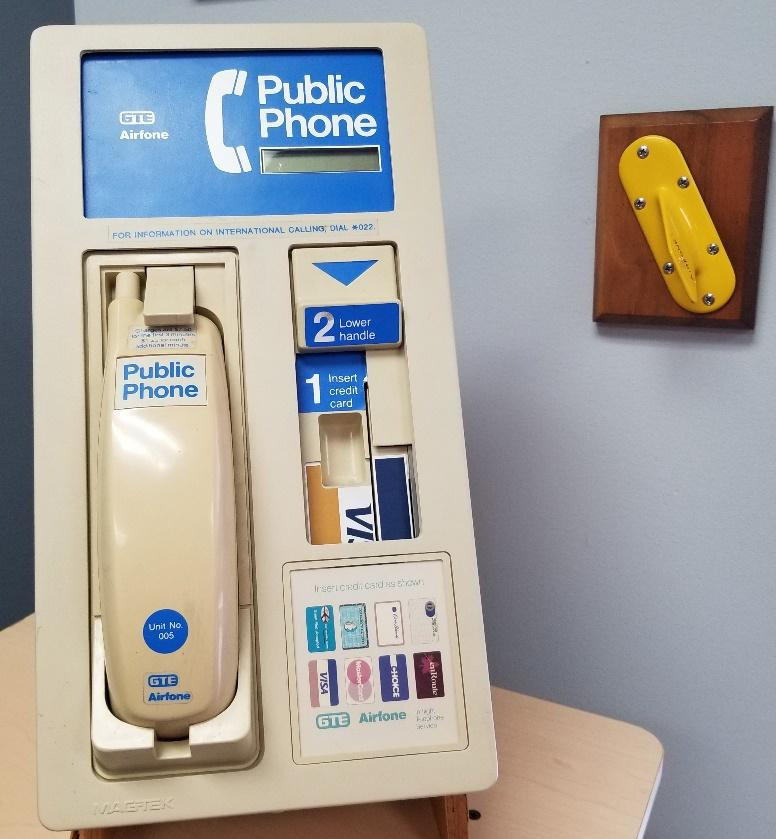
Airfone passenger phone

Airfone was an air-ground radiotelephone service developed by MCI founder John D. Goeken, and operated under the names Airfone, GTE Airfone, and Verizon Airfone. Airfone allowed passengers to make telephone calls (later including data modem service) in-flight. Airfone handsets were often located in the middle airliner seatbacks, with two handsets per row for 6-wide coach seating configurations, and more or less depending on the aircraft layout and fare class. First class cabins typically had one handset per seat. Some planes had one or more bulkhead mounted phone stations with cordless handsets that the passengers could use, instead of the multiple wired handsets. Airfone phone calls were usually quite expensive compared to ground-based telephone calls, costing $3.99 per call and $4.99 per minute in 2006.

The original Airfone main office and network operations center are located at 2809 Butterfield Rd, Oak Brook, Illinois. The network operations center remains at this location.

Bell Mobility used the Airfone technology on Air Canada flights, but branded its service as Skytel (no relation to the Verizon-owned paging firm of the same name).

== Use ==
Calls were often discounted or free for customers of airplane-based catalogs like Sky Mall, and Verizon Wireless subscribers could pay $10 per month and 10 cents a call or a flat 69 cents per call with no monthly fee. Airfone could be used for very slow modem calls, and attempts at data service were made in 2003 and 2004 using an on-board email proxy server.

Many of the in-flight calls made by victims of the September 11, 2001 attacks were made over Airfone and Air One.

Air One was Airfone's primary competitor, operated by AT&T Wireless division Claircom Communications Group, and was available onboard American Airlines, Northwest Airlines, and select Delta Air Lines aircraft. The Air One service was discontinued in 2002.

== History ==
=== Development ===
The Airfone was originated by John D. Goeken (who also founded MCI Communications and FTD's Mercury Network) in the 1970s. Western Union purchased a 50 percent share in Airfone in 1981 and sold to GTE in 1986 for US$39 million cash. Delta Air Lines offered the United States's first public air-to-ground telephone system with Airfone.

The first iteration of Airfone service only permitted air-to-ground calls and frequently dropped calls. A new generation dubbed GenStar was developed jointly by GTE and IEX Corp. in 1992. IEX developed the software, which ran on hardware built by Stratus Computers. GenStar introduced the capacity for airborne nodes to also receive calls, and for connections to be handed over between ground cells as the aircraft moved through them, reducing dropped calls. Handsets also gained screens and RJ11 jacks for fax and modem transmissions.

=== Demise ===
The head of the Airfone division told The New York Times in 2004 that only two to three people use the Airfone service per flight. In May and June 2006, the frequencies over which Airfone operated were sold at auction by the U.S. Federal Communications Commission (FCC) to two new licenseholders, Aircell and LiveTV. Under the terms of the FCC order that authorized the auction, Verizon received a non-renewable license until 2010, but had two years from the end of the auction to redeploy Airfone to use less bandwidth and share spectrum with one of the license winners.

On June 23, 2006, Verizon Communications, Airfone's parent company, announced that they would be discontinuing their Airfone service on all commercial flights by the end of 2006. They cited the declining use of the service, as well as a desire to focus on their key businesses: broadband, wireless and wireline services. Airfone service was installed on 1,000 aircraft belonging to United Airlines and Continental Airlines. US Airways and Delta Air Lines have removed all Airfone handsets from their planes. Verizon will continue to provide service on 3,400 private and government aircraft.

On December 28, 2007, Airfone announced it would discontinue service effective December 31, 2008 unless it successfully concludes negotiations with LiveTV, an affiliate of JetBlue, to take over the business on that date. On June 9, 2008, JetBlue announced that it would buy Verizon's Airfone service. The sale of Verizon Airfone to LiveTV (JetBlue) was separate from the sale of the bandwidth that Verizon Airfone used for its operations. In another transaction, LiveTV acquired about 1/3 of the original Airfone bandwidth from the FCC.

=== LiveTV continues in-flight voice for general aviation ===
For a time LiveTV offered, nationwide, mobile telephone style voice service to general aviation aircraft. This service was identical to the original Verizon Airfone service. However, because of the change of bandwidth allocation, all of the existing Airfone transceivers in the aircraft were required to be replaced.

=== Sale to Aircell ===
In April 2013, Aircell acquired LiveTV's Airfone business unit, and announced that in order to support capacity-expansion for the Gogo Biz in-flight Internet service, the Airfone service was permanently decommissioned on December 31, 2013.
