= John D. Goeken =

American telecommunications entrepreneur

John D. "Jack" Goeken (August 22, 1930 – September 16, 2010) was an American telecommunications entrepreneur. Goeken founded multiple communications companies, often pursuing innovative technologies despite significant skepticism and resistance. He was the founder of Microwave Communications Inc. in the early 1960s, initially established to support the sale of two-way radios. The company would go on to play a major role in transforming the U.S. telecommunications industry by introducing lower-cost long-distance telephone service for consumers and businesses. Other ventures included Airfone and In-Flight Phone, which were instrumental in developing air-to-ground telephone systems, as well as the digital network later adopted by FTD florists.

== Early life and education ==
John D. Goeken was born on August 22, 1930, in Joliet, Illinois. His father was a Lutheran minister.

== Career ==
=== MCI Communications ===
Goeken founded his company, originally named Microwave Communications Inc., after leaving the Army, where he had gained experience with microwave technology. At the time, truckers traveling between Chicago and St. Louis were unable to use two-way radios over long distances due to limited signal range. Goeken addressed this by building a network of microwave towers along the route to relay signals.

The company faced opposition from established telecommunications firms, which filed challenges with the Federal Communications Commission (FCC). Despite this, the FCC granted MCI the right to compete with AT&T for long-distance service in 1971. In 1974, MCI filed an antitrust lawsuit against AT&T, alleging anti-competitive practices. The lawsuit initiated the process that ultimately led to the breakup of AT&T. It resulted in a settlement under which AT&T agreed to divest its local telephone operations, culminating in its breakup in 1984.

Goeken left MCI in 1974 following a disagreement with William G. McGowan, whom he had brought on to help raise capital. Goeken favored focusing on business clients, while McGowan steered the company toward consumer services. McGowan later became chairman of MCI Communications, while Goeken retained an ownership stake after his departure.

=== Airfone ===
Despite widespread skepticism about the demand for in-flight communication, Goeken founded Airfone, a company providing air-to-ground telephone service. He later sold a stake in the company to GTE Corporation to secure funding but ultimately departed following disagreements over GTE’s management approach.

After selling Airfone Corp. to GTE Corp., Goeken alleged that GTE breached their contract by not allowing him to run the company as he saw fit, and he asked a court to void his non-compete agreement. A court agreed, and Goeken then founded In-Flight Phone Corporation in Oakbrook Terrace, Illinois, with the intent of competing with GTE Airfone, which held a monopoly on air-to-ground telecommunications. In 1990, the FCC approved Goeken's plan to share the Airfone frequencies, and solicited applications for and subsequently issued licences to several companies to operate digital Terrestrial Aeronautical Public Correspondence (TAPC) services. In-Flight Phone Corp. was awarded one of these licenses, and Goeken was clear to compete with GTE Airfone.

In-Flight Phone Corporation attracted more than $200 million from investors, and Goeken set out to build the first nationwide digital air-to-ground telecommunications network, capable of delivering static-free telephone calls, internet service and information services, to airplane seats. The company successfully competed for service contracts with USAir and other airlines. In 1996, Goeken sold In-Flight Phone Corp. to MCI Corp.

=== FTD Mercury ===
Goeken developed FTD Mercury, a computer network used by florists to transmit flower orders electronically.

=== Goeken Group ===
In 1995, he established Goeken Group, a holding company to manage his business ventures.

== Personal life ==
Goeken was married to Mona Lisa Goeken for 59 years. The couple met in high school and lived in the same home in Plainfield, Illinois, for over 40 years. They had a daughter, Sandra Goeken Miles, who was involved in his business ventures; a son, John; and seven grandchildren.

Goeken was interested in aviation and was a licensed pilot. He was commonly known as "Jack".

== Death ==
Goeken died on September 16, 2010, at the Provena St. Joseph Medical Center in Joliet. He had been undergoing treatment for esophageal cancer for five years.
