= Sir Grapefellow and Baron von Redberry =

Breakfast cereal made by General Mills

Sir Grapefellow and Baron von Redberry were breakfast cereals created by General Mills around 1972. Sir Grapefellow featured a British World War I era pilot of the same name. The cereal consisted of "grape flavored oat cereal with sweet grape starbits (marshmallows)". Baron Von Redberry featured a World War I era German pilot, presumably modeled on “Red Baron” Manfred Albrecht Freiherr von Richthofen. The cereal itself consisted of berry-flavored oat cereal with sweet berry marshmallows and tasted strongly of fruit punch.

Baron Von Redberry and Sir Grapefellow were nemesis and mascots of General Mills cereal brand. In the vein of the cereal rivalries Quisp & Quake and Count Chocula & Franken Berry bickering over which one was better, Redberry would proclaim, "Baron Von Redberry is der berry goodest!" and Grapefellow would counter, "Sir Grapefellow is the grapest!"

These cereals were since discontinued in 1975 as they were outsold by the generally-acclaimed Monster Cereals that were marketed in every Halloween season.
