= Wanchai Ferry =

Wanchai Ferry may refer to:

- Wan Chai Ferry Pier, a ferry pier in Wan Chai, Hong Kong
- Wanchai Ferry (brand), a brand of dumplings and other Chinese foods owned by General Mills
