= Haircut (album) =

1993 American blues rock album by George Thorogood and the Destroyers

Studio album by George Thorogood and the Destroyers
- Released: July 27, 1993 (US); August 1993 (UK)
- Studios: Sounds Unreel Studios, Memphis, TN; Compass Point Studios, Nassau, Bahamas
- Genres: Blues rock; boogie rock
- Length: 42:49
- Label: EMI America
- Producers: Terry Manning, The Delaware Destroyers

George Thorogood and the Destroyers chronology
| Boogie People (1991) | Haircut (1993) | Live: Let's Work Together (1995) |

Singles from Haircut
- 1. "Get a Haircut" Released: July 20, 1993; 2. "Howlin' for My Baby" Released: 1993; 3. "Gone Dead Train" Released: 1993; 4. "Killer's Bluze" Released: 1994

Haircut is the ninth studio album by American blues rock band George Thorogood and the Destroyers. It was released on July 27, 1993, by the label EMI America Records. The first single from the album was "Get a Haircut", which charted in multiple countries. The album peaked at No. 120 on the Billboard 200. The band supported the album with a North American tour.

== Recording ==
Recording of the album took place at the Sounds Unreel Studios in Memphis, Tennessee, and the Compass Point Studios in Nassau, The Bahamas. The album was produced by Terry Manning.

== Content ==
The album contains almost all cover material, except one song written by Thorogood. "Want Ad Blues" is a cover of the John Lee Hooker song. "Gone Dead Train" was written by Jack Nitzsche. Thorogood wrote "Baby Don't Go". "Howlin' for My Baby" was written by Willie Dixon and Howlin' Wolf. The album cover art was drawn by Peter Bagge and inked by Jim Woodring.

== Release ==
EMI America released Haircut on July 27, 1993. The album debuted at No. 133, and peaked at No. 120 on the Billboard 200 chart. The album was certified gold by Music Canada, where it sold more than 40,000 units.

"Get A Haircut" was the lead single from the album. The song was released on July 20, 1993. It peaked at No. 2 on the Album Rock Tracks chart, and was the No. 1 most played song in Canada on FM radio. "Howlin' for My Baby" was the second single. It debuted at No. 34, and peaked at No. 12 on the Album Rock Tracks chart. "Gone Dead Train" debuted at No. 39, and peaked at No. 24 on the same chart. "Killer's Bluze" was released as a single in 1994.

== Critical reception ==
Haircut received mixed reviews from critics.

Professional ratings
Review scores
| Source | Rating |
|---|---|
| AllMusic | 3/5 stars |
| Calgary Herald | B |
| The Great Rock Discography | 4/10 |
| Music Connection | 5/10 |
| The Indianapolis Star | 2/4 stars |
| The Penguin Guide to Blues Recordings | 3/4 stars |
| The Philadelphia Inquirer | 2/4 stars |
| The Rolling Stone Jazz & Blues Album Guide | 3/5 stars |
| The Virgin Encyclopedia of the Blues | 2/5 stars |
| Windsor Star | B+ |

Ron Wynn of AllMusic wrote that "Thorogood's work has never lost its edge because he avoids becoming indulgent or a parody, and continues to sound genuinely interested in and a fan of the tunes he's doing." The Windsor Star wrote that "the guitar-slinging motor mouth offers another round of stinging and rocking blues, featuring that consistently fat sound with which his band has made its trademark style." The Calgary Herald deemed Haircut "boogie blues and rock 'n' roll ... And, yep, he hasn't changed a thing." The Colorado Springs Gazette-Telegraph opined that "since shtick is exactly what Thorogood's become reduced to, the only phrase that comes to mind listening to this is, 'get a real job'." Michael Kramer of Music Connection called "Get A Haircut", "an instant Thorogood standard, right up there with "Bad To The Bone" and "I Drink Alone"," but considered the rest of the album "a letdown", adding "Although his vocals and guitar are as good as ever, none of the other songs are particularly exciting or even catchy."

The Canadian Press called it "another slice of devil-may-care, comically anti-authoritarian riff rock". The Boston Globe concluded that "Thorogood doesn't gain any dramatic ground, but his loyalty to his favorite idioms remains genuine." The Indianapolis Star praised the "stark, deliberative" "Killer's Bluze". Keith Zimmerman of The Gavin Report called the album "Thorogood's strongest release in memory."

== Track listing ==
Haircut Track Listing
| No. | Title | Writer(s) | Length |
|---|---|---|---|
| 1. | "Get a Haircut" | David Avery, Bill Birch | 4:12 |
| 2. | "Howlin' for My Baby" | Willie Dixon, Howlin' Wolf | 5:14 |
| 3. | "Killer's Bluze" | Dex Rogers | 6:10 |
| 4. | "Down in the Bottom" | Willie Dixon | 4:03 |
| 5. | "I'm Ready" | Willie Dixon | 3:36 |
| 6. | "Cops and Robbers" | Bo Diddley | 4:50 |
| 7. | "Gone Dead Train" | Jack Nitzsche, Russ Titelman | 4:07 |
| 8. | "Want Ad Blues" | John Lee Hooker | 5:06 |
| 9. | "My Friend Robert" | Patrick Sky | 2:30 |
| 10. | "Baby Don't Go" | George Thorogood | 3:24 |
| Total length: | | | 42:49 |

== Personnel ==
The following personnel are credited on the album:

=== Musicians ===
- George Thorogood – guitar, vocals
- Billy Blough – bass guitar
- Hank Carter – keyboards, saxophone, background vocals
- Jeff Simon – drums

=== Technical ===
- Delaware Destroyers – producer
- Terry Manning – producer, engineer, mixing
- Bob Ludwig – mastering
- Henry Marquez – art direction
- Peter Bagge – cover art

== Charts ==
| Chart (1993) | Peak position |
|---|---|
| Australia (ARIA) | 41 |
| Canada (RPM) | 22 |
| New Zealand (RMNZ) | 37 |
| US Billboard 200 | 120 |
