= If You Don't Start Drinkin' =

"If You Don't Start Drinkin' (I'm Gonna Leave)"

Single by George Thorogood & The Destroyers

from the album Boogie People
- B-side: "Born in Chicago"
- Released: January 1991
- Recorded: November 1990
- Studio: Studio Six, Memphis
- Genre: Blues rock; hard rock
- Length: 4:11
- Label: EMI America
- Songwriter: George Thorogood
- Producers: Terry Manning; Delaware Destroyers

George Thorogood & The Destroyers singles chronology
"You Talk Too Much" (1988)	"If You Don't Start Drinkin' (I'm Gonna Leave)" (1991)	"Hello Little Girl" (1991)

Music video
- "If You Don't Start Drinkin' (I'm Gonna Leave)" on YouTube

"If You Don't Start Drinkin' (I'm Gonna Leave)" is a rock song by American blues rock band George Thorogood and the Destroyers, released in January 1991 as the lead single from their album Boogie People by EMI America. It was written by George Thorogood. The song is one of Thorogood's most popular, it is often played live and is included on several live and compilation albums.

== Writing ==
Thorogood first came up with the title for the song, and originally intended to give it to Tom Waits. The song describes a man trying to get his wife to start drinking alcohol with him, threatening to leave her if she does not.

== Release ==
The song was released as the lead single from their eighth studio album Boogie People. The song debuted at No. 12, and peaked at No. 5 on the Mainstream Rock chart.

The music video for the song was made by David Hogan.

== Controversy ==
Following the single's release, Stephanine Lesky, an executive director at the Alcoholism and Drug Abuse Council in Orange County, New York called for radio stations in New York to not play the song, claiming it promoted abuse and drinking and driving. EMI America and Thorogood have denied this claim, with EMI America issuing a statement saying: "The song in question is meant as a tongue-in-cheek exchange between two adults in the privacy of their own home and should in no way be construed as an endorsement of indiscriminate drinking."

Thorogood has said that he was afraid the song would be controversial, and that he brought it up to EMI America, but they ended up releasing it anyway.

== Personnel ==
- George Thorogood – guitar, vocals
- Steve Chrismar - guitar
- Hank Carter – saxophone
- Billy Blough – bass
- Jeff Simon – drums

== Charts ==
Chart (1991)	Peak position
Australia (ARIA)	109
US Billboard Mainstream Rock Tracks	5
Canada RPM Adult Contemporary	35
