= MCI Mail =

American commercial email service

External videos
- MCI Mail TV advertisements via YouTube, ca. 1983
- Video 1
- Video 2
- Video 3

MCI Mail was one of the first commercial email services in the United States and predates the widespread adoption of the Internet.

== History ==
The MCI Mail service was launched on September 23, 1983, in Washington, D.C., during a press conference that was hosted by MCI's founder and Chairman, William G. McGowan. MCI Mail was the first commercial email service to use the Internet, in 1989. The service was officially decommissioned by MCI at 11:59 p.m. ET on June 30, 2003.

=== Founders ===
==== William G. McGowan ====
William G. McGowan, MCI's founder and chairman, joined the corporation in 1968. In the early stages of creation, McGowan and his fellow contributors got their inspiration from corporations such as Telenet and Western Union's EasyLink. With a primary goal of broadcasting MCI Mail services on an international level, he headed a lobbying campaign to fight for the Federal Communications Commission (FCC) approval to expand. Upon approval by the FCC to begin working, McGowan knew he had to keep up with the challenges and threats that its biggest competitor, AT&T, imposed.

==== Robert Harcharik ====
Robert Harcharik was the President of Tymnet when he was recruited to MCI to develop what he called a "digital postoffice." Eventually this service became known as MCI Mail. Harcharik recruited and organized a development team that included Vint Cerf.

==== Vint Cerf ====
In late 1982, Vint Cerf, one of the original designers of the MCI email service, was one of the main contractors who served from 1982 to 1986 as MCI's Vice President of Digital Information Services. During his time in office, he acted as one of the driving forces behind the creation of the MCI Mail service. Cerf worked on the data networking related hardware and software applications of the MCI Mail. After an eight-year separation from the corporation to work with his Internet partner, Robert E. Kahn at the Corporation for National Research Initiatives (CNRI), Cerf returned to MCI in 1994, where he served as Senior Vice President of Technology Strategy until 2005 when MCI was sold to Verizon.

== Functions and applications ==
=== Electronic mail ===
The service initially allowed users to send electronic text-based messages to other MCI Mail users. MCI Mail also supported read receipts and charge codes, allowing for cost accounting for email. Later, the service was expanded so that users could send messages to non-MCI Mail users, including users on other public messaging services, such as AT&T Mail, CompuServe, and SprintMail. By 1989, a gateway to the Internet was also provided. MCI Mail users were assigned an email address of either their MCI Mail ID @mcimail.com (e.g. 2180241@mcimail.com), their user name @mcimail.com (e.g. bsmith@mcimail.com), or their formal name @mcimail.com (e.g. Bob_Smith@mcimail.com). Several email software products were developed to facilitate email handling from a PC. These included Lotus Express, Norton Commander's MCI Mail utility, MailRoom from Sierra Solutions, Emma, and MCI's own MCI Mail Express and Express Lite. The email facility in Microsoft Bob also used MCI Mail.

=== Paper mail ===
Customers could send hard-copy MCI Letter messages to postal addresses. These were laser printed at an MCI Mail print site, placed in an envelope and mailed via the U.S. Postal Service. The cost was $2 for up to 3 pages for an MCI Letter, and $9 for an Overnight Letter. The service was attractive because there were few affordable letter-quality laser printers available to consumers at the time. Most consumers could only afford low quality dot matrix printers, which were not suitable for business correspondence. It also saved a trip to the post office. Prior to 1996, the service also allowed users a 4-Hour delivery option. The 4-hour service in particular was attractive as no one else offered the ability to print a document and have it delivered in this time frame. There were 15 print facilities around the U.S. which offered this service. The most popular locations were New York, Washington, D.C., and Los Angeles. At one point there was a print facility in Hawaii and they also ventured into the international space with a location in Brussels, Belgium. The hard copy delivery service was later discontinued due to the high operating cost, the increasing availability of letter-quality home printers, and the increased use of email.

=== Fax and Telex dispatch ===
MCI Mail also offered gateways to faxing called Fax Dispatch (email to fax, outbound only) and telex called Telex Dispatch (in and outbound).

== Business services ==
=== Remote Electronic Mail System (REMS) ===
MCI Mail supported gateways to local area networks by use of its REMS ("Remote Electronic Mail System") addressing. REMS addressing took the form of {display name}|REMS:{rems name}/{network mapping on the email server}. For example, Bob Smith|REMS:XYZCompany/ntserver/email/bsmith.

== Pricing for services (1993) ==
- A yearly subscription to a "mailbox" was $35.
- Paper Mail cost $2, including delivery and $5.50 outside of the United States.
- Electronic Mail cost 50 cents for the first 500 characters.
- Faxes and Telexes started at 50 cents for delivery to the United States.

== Network technology ==
MCI Mail was a custom software application developed for MCI by Digital Equipment Corporation (DEC) Software Services organization, running under the VMS operating system, initially on VAX 780's, and by Hewlett-Packard, running under the MPE operating system, on HP-3000 computers with output generated on HP laser printers. In 1985, MCI International entered the email landscape using Data General MV Series minicomputers and co-developed propitiatory applications using the X.400 email protocol standards. The Data General Eclipse MV/8000 was the first in a family of 32-bit minicomputers using their AOS/VS operating system and supported the notion of lightweight "tasks" as well as processes. The first MCI International offerings were developed for their French market. Access to the initial MCI Mail service was provided using a 110-, 300-, 1200-, 2400- or (5600 was probably a typo for 9600 because 56 kbit/s V.90 modems came out in 1998) bits/second modem connected to a standard telephone land line. The toll-free access number for MCI Mail was (800) 444-Mail. From outside the United States, MCI Mail could be accessed via local packet switching services that were offered by local telephone companies. Around 1990 access was also provided via Infonet's dedicated data network. MCI Mail branded this access service: MCI Mail Global Access.

== Sales and marketing ==
The service was primarily sold using a third-party "agency program". Agents were paid a commission on usage. One of these agents, Gary Oppenheimer, created what is believed to be the first electronically delivered newsletter. Called the PEN (Periodic Electronic Newsletter), it was published from August 1985 until November 1996, and provided both customers and many MCI employees with information on a few features available, as well as hints and tricks for using MCI Mail. Long before spam became a problem on the Internet, Oppenheimer broadcast the planned table of contents, giving the recipients the opportunity to opt-out of receiving the newsletter. The final edition of the PEN newsletter included articles on Concert Packet Switching Service for MCI Mail, MCI Mail Telephone update, Cellular Access to MCI Mail, List of Access Cellular Numbers, Logon Procedures, X.400 Access via Frame Relay, MCI Never Busy Fax, Mailroom/Mailplus & MIME, internetMCI software, domainTNG, Newsgroups/Lists, and Web Surfing via MCI Mail.

== Decommission ==
In the mid 1990s, the Internet became a commercialized platform offering free email services by top industry vendors such as Hotmail. This shift rocked MCI Mail's electronic message delivery and receiving rates, as customers were more inclined to use services available to them with no charge. In addition to an increase in industry competition, the modernization of the fax machine proved more efficient and valuable to customers than MCI Mail's services.

These industry advances contributed to the eventual decommission of MCI Mail on June 30, 2003, at 11:59 P.M. ET.
