= Boogie People =

1991 American blues rock album by George Thorogood and the Destroyers

Studio album by George Thorogood and the Destroyers
- Released: February 26, 1991 (US); April 1991 (UK)
- Recorded: November 1990
- Genres: Blues rock; boogie rock
- Length: 39:14
- Label: EMI
- Producers: Terry Manning; The Destroyers

George Thorogood and the Destroyers chronology
| Born to Be Bad (1988) | Boogie People (1991) | Haircut (1993) |

Singles from Boogie People
- 1. "If You Don't Start Drinkin' (I'm Gonna Leave)" Released: 1991; 2. "Hello Little Girl" Released: 1991

Boogie People is the eighth studio album by American blues rock band George Thorogood and the Destroyers. It was released in 1991 by the label EMI America Records. The album was not as successful as Thorogood's previous albums, but it did contain the song "If You Don't Start Drinkin' (I'm Gonna Leave)", which eventually became a concert staple.

The album was produced by Terry Manning, as well as the Destroyers themselves.

Following Boogie People's release, the Destroyers embarked on a tour supporting the album, beginning March 16.

== Release ==
EMI America released Boogie People on February 26, 1991. The album debuted at No. 148, and peaked at No. 77 on the Billboard 200 chart. The album eventually sold more than 300,000 copies.

Two singles were released from the album. "If You Don't Start Drinkin' (I'm Gonna Leave)" was the lead single. The single peaked at No. 5 on the Mainstream Rock chart. "Hello Little Girl" was also released as a single. It debuted at No. 36, and peaked at No. 15 on the Mainstream Rock chart. Music videos were made for both singles.

== Touring and promotion ==
The tour for the album began March 16, 1991. The first leg of the tour was completed by May. They didn't tour until the second leg of their tour in July. On July 28, they played at the Oregon State Penitentiary in Salem. The tour ended on August 31, in Allentown, Pennsylvania.

A listening party was held for the album in April 1991 by A.H. Entertainers. Excerpts from the album were played on the French rock radio station Oüi FM.

== Critical reception ==
Boogie People received generally positive reviews from critics.

Professional ratings
Review scores
| Source | Rating |
|---|---|
| AllMusic | 4/5 stars |
| Billboard | (unrated) |
| The Great Rock Discography | 4/10 |
| Music Connection | 9/10 |
| The Penguin Guide to Blues Recordings | 3/4 stars |
| The Virgin Encyclopedia of the Blues | 2/5 stars |

Tom Kidd in a review for Music Connection wrote "Thorogood knows that the blues is as never-ending as a cross-country drive and as rowdy as a bunch of buddies drinking Thunderbird. There are no studio tricks production-wise, but that doesn't keep ballsy tracks like "If You Don't Start Drinkin' (I'm Gonna Leave)" from sounding modern. And neither do Thorogood's lyrics go out of date, whether he's singing about the girl he drove away from or the one who drove him to drink. This is one ginsoaked party record you can love even if you're sober." Kent Zimmerman of the Gavin Report said that "The direction Boogie People takes is more constant, more strict, loud blues." and "With its strength as a complete album, Boogie People should reestablish George Thorogood's long dormant reputation as a purveyor of fiery coliseum blues."

AllMusic's Alex Henderson says that "Thorogood can usually be counted on to deliver infectious, rowdy blues-rock, and Boogie People is no exception. Though not quite on a par with Bad To The Bone, this is an unpretentious party album with more than a few assets."

== Track listing ==
Boogie People Track Listing
| No. | Title | Writer(s) | Length |
|---|---|---|---|
| 1. | "If You Don't Start Drinkin' (I'm Gonna Leave)" | George Thorogood | 4:11 |
| 2. | "Long Distance Lover" | Thorogood | 3:57 |
| 3. | "Mad Man Blues" | John Lee Hooker | 3:26 |
| 4. | "Boogie People" | Cyril B. Bunter, Thorogood | 3:33 |
| 5. | "I Can't Be Satisfied" | McKinley Morganfield | 3:38 |
| 6. | "No Place to Go" | Chester Arthur Burnett | 4:42 |
| 7. | "Six Days on the Road" | Earl Green, Carl Montgomery | 4:27 |
| 8. | "Born in Chicago" | Nick Gravenites | 3:24 |
| 9. | "Oklahoma Sweetheart" | Thorogood | 4:30 |
| 10. | "Hello Little Girl" | Chuck Berry | 3:46 |
| Total length: | | | 39:14 |

== Personnel ==
The following personnel are credited on the album:

=== Musicians ===
- George Thorogood – rhythm guitar, slide guitar, vocals
- Billy Blough – bass guitar
- Hank Carter – saxophone, vocals
- Jeff Simon – drums
- Steve Chrismar – lead guitar

=== Technical ===
- Delaware Destroyers – producer
- Terry Manning – producer, engineer, mixing
- Bob Ludwig – mastering
- Diane Cuddy – design
- Henry Marquez – art direction
- Alan Messer – photography (front cover)
- Jeffrey Scales – photography (back cover)
- John Tobler – liner notes

== Charts ==
Chart performance for Boogie People
| Chart (1991) | Peak position |
|---|---|
| Australian Albums (ARIA) | 45 |
| Canada (RPM) | 29 |
| New Zealand Albums (RMNZ) | 13 |
| US Billboard 200 | 77 |
