= Lärabar =

Brand of energy bars manufactured by General Mills

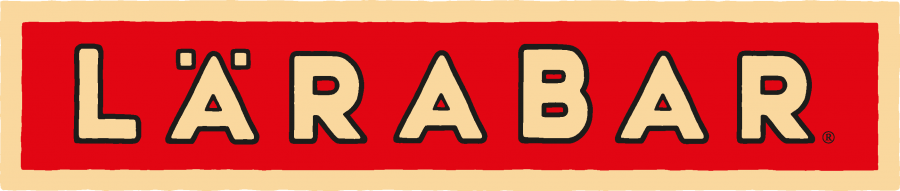

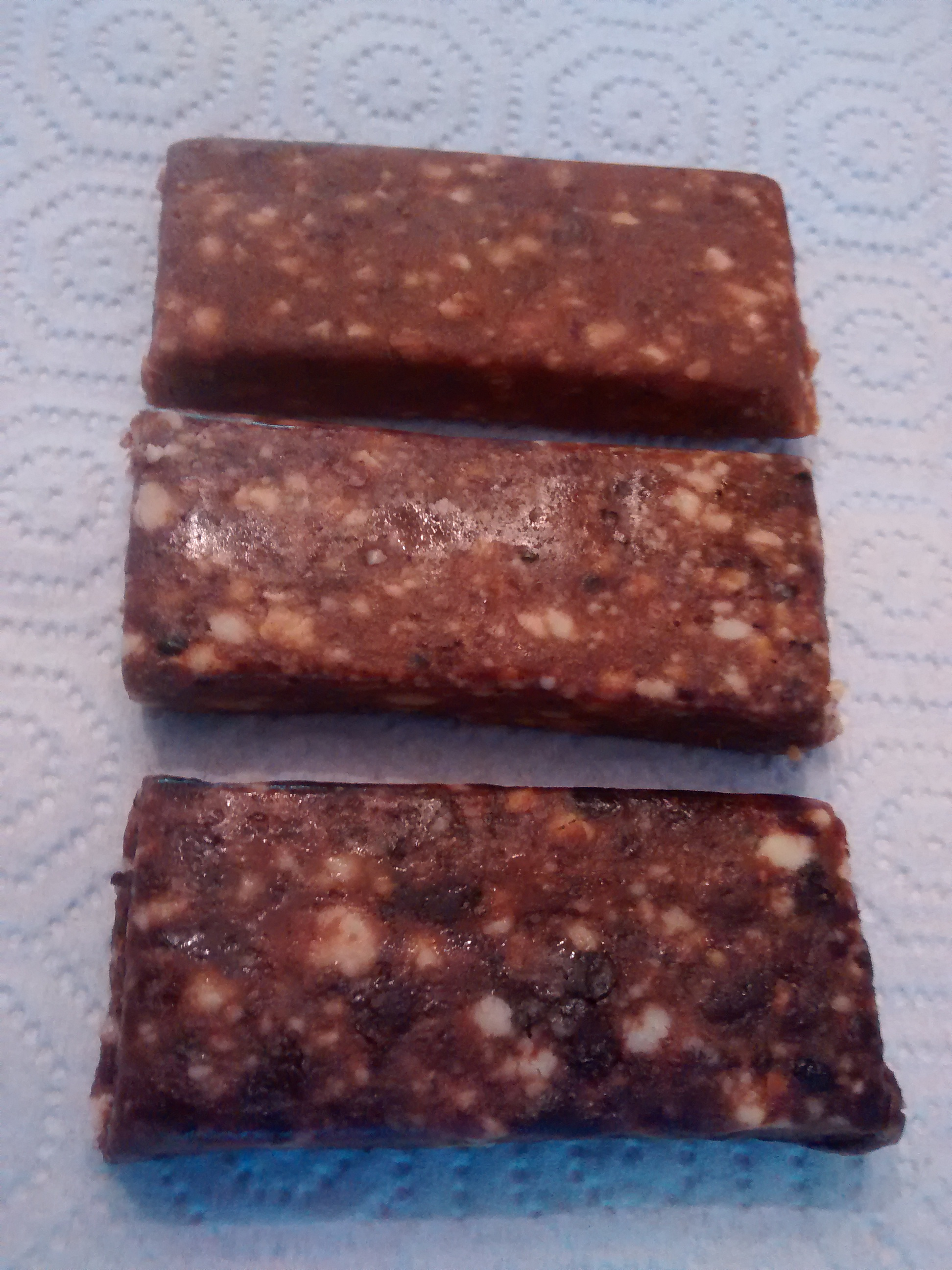
- Three Lärabar bars: from top to bottom, peanut butter cookie, cashew cookie, and cherry pie
- Product type: Energy bars
- Current owner: General Mills
- Country: United States
- Introduced: April 14, 2003; 23 years ago
- Markets: United States, Canada, United Kingdom
- Previous owners: Humm Foods
- Website: www.larabar.com

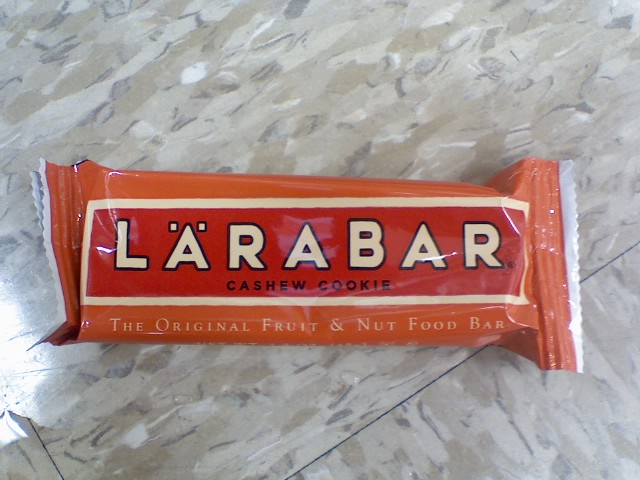
A Lärabar bar

Lärabar is a brand of energy bars produced by General Mills. The bars come in a variety of flavors such as apple pie, carrot cake, cinnamon roll, and mint chip brownie.

== History ==
Lärabar was created by Denver native Lara Merriken, who was looking to make a "very healthy product that tasted delicious". According to the General Mills website, Merriken's inspiration for the snack occurred during a hiking trip in 2000 through the Rocky Mountains of Colorado. As she was running down the mountain, she was inspired to create a food bar that was made out of only fruits, nuts, and spices. The umlaut on the ä is decorative.

Merriken founded the company, Humm Foods in 2003, which created the original Lärabars. The bars were first introduced for sale in the United States on April 14, 2003. The original flavors were cherry pie, apple pie, cashew cookie, banana bread, and chocolate coconut chew.

In 2008, General Mills acquired the original producer of Lärabar, Humm Foods. The product line has been expanded to more than 30 varieties, including high-protein bars and bars for children.

In 2019, the Lärabar range launched in the United Kingdom.

== Reviews ==
An April 2007 review in the Pittsburgh Post-Gazette praised Lärabar, writing "The bar is moist and chewy, tart and tasty. None of the medicinal tastes of other protein bars." The bar's "authentic" taste and use as a breakfast meal have also been complimented.

== Recalls ==
In January 2009, General Mills voluntarily recalled peanut butter cookie flavor Lärabar for fear of salmonella contamination. No illnesses were reported.
