= Koala Lumpur: Journey to the Edge =

1997 adventure video game

Koala Lumpur: Journey To The Edge
- European cover art
- Developers: Media Concrete; Colossal Pictures
- Publisher: Broderbund
- Producer: Pola Ayllon
- Programmers: Bob Arient; Dan Kelmenson
- Artist: James S. Baker
- Composer: Greg Hale Jones
- Platform: Microsoft Windows
- Release: 7 February 1997
- Genre: Adventure
- Mode: Single-player

Koala Lumpur: Journey To The Edge is a 1997 video game developed by Media Concrete, published by Broderbund, and co-produced by Colossal Pictures for Microsoft Windows. It is a comedic adventure video game in which players guide a mystic koala, Koala Lumpur, and his colleague Dr. Dingo Tu-Far to find pieces of a lost scroll. Players guide a housefly that assists Koala Lumpur to locate objects, navigate mazes, and solve puzzles. The game was conceived by James Baker of Colossal Pictures as an animated cartoon series, and adapted into a video game by Broderbund. The title was one of several games for adult audiences published by Broderbund in 1997, after a period of only releasing children's educational video games. Upon release, Koala Lumpur received average reviews, with critics praising its sense of humour and cartoonlike visual presentation, although critiquing some of the game's puzzles.

== Gameplay ==
The visual presentation of Koala Lumpur was hand-drawn and animated by Colossal Pictures animators.

The objective of the game is to assist the protagonists Koala Lumpur and Dr. Dingo Tu-Far to locate and read several scrolls. Players control a housefly using the mouse cursor to navigate levels, and can enter and explore doors, windows and passageways to find new areas. Players use point-and-click controls to select objects of interest and prompt Koala Lumpur to interact with items. Objects picked up by players can also be stored by Koala in his fez for later use. Levels are set across backgrounds that scroll horizontally as the player travels across the screen, with some levels looping seamlessly in 360 degrees. The game features a range of puzzles, including those requiring players to locate and use items from their inventory, applying knowledge from objects such as books, computers and answering machines found throughout the game, and navigating mazes.

== Plot ==
Koala Lumpur (Phil Robinson), a koala and Zen Master, develops a case of indigestion after eating a vindaloo from a previous reincarnation. Chanting a sutra from an ancient scroll in his fez hat to find relief, he accidentally summons the demon Macho de Nada, who threatens to bring about the Comedy Apocalypse. A goddess, Ella Mental, appears to instruct Koala that he can prevent the end of the world and achieve enlightenment by finding the Lost Scroll of Cartoon Prophesies. To help him in his quest, Koala summons a housefly named Fly as his assistant and spiritual guide. Koala first searches for his missing friend, a dingo named Dr. Dingo Tu-Far (John Stevenson). Dr. Dingo had disappeared after becoming trapped in a high-tech safe in an attempt to invent a washing machine that removes dirt through teleportation. Once reunited, Koala and Dr. Dingo travel on board Koala's Trans-Temporal Recreation Vehicle to journey together to search for pieces of the Scroll. They arrive at the Land of Lost Things, a labyrinth of tunnels ruled by a ventriloquist dummy and old acquaintance of Koala named Woody Knot. Other antagonists encountered by the duo include Tuff Luv, a dominatrix and ex-girlfriend of Dr. Dingo, and Annie Body, a lonely and sadistic child prodigy who wants to keep Koala and Dingo as pets. Other locations include the Stream of Consciousness, and a space station named The Eye in the Sky. Once Koala and Dingo collect all the pieces of the Lost Scroll, they summon a hammer that allows them to banish Macho de Nada back to the afterlife. Ella Mental admits that she lied to Koala and that enlightenment is not something that can be obtained as a reward; Koala muses that "the journey is its own reward".

== Development ==
Koala Lumpur was developed by the interactive division of San Francisco animation studio Colossal Pictures and multimedia design company Media Concrete, and published by Broderbund. Developers Media Concrete, led by directors Stuart Cudlitz, George Consagra and Anne Ashbey, were former members of Colossal's New Media Division. Koala Lumpur was announced in 1996 as a comedic adventure game, accompanying seven announced titles to be published by Broderbund in 1997, including The Last Express. This announcement was viewed by publications as reflecting a return to adventure titles and games for adults for Broderbund after a period of publishing only edutainment games.

The concept for Koala Lumpur was created by director and Colossal Pictures employee James Baker, originally conceived as a pitch for an animated series. Colossal Pictures' interactive division had come across materials that Baker had unsuccessfully pitched to Nickelodeon network executives as a cartoon. The studio provided the materials to Broderbund and proposed to turn the concept and characters into a video game. Colossal Pictures provided the artwork and character design for the game, which were hand-drawn on paper by twenty animators and partially completed at StarToons Studio in Chicago. Broderbund handled the programming, game design and sound. Following several months of casting, Phil Robinson, who had been providing a "temporary concept voice" for the character Koala Lumpur during development, was recruited as the lead voice actor. The character Dingo Tu-Far was voiced acted by John Stevenson, after whom the character was modelled.

Creation of Koala Lumpur experienced disruption as Colossal filed for Chapter 11 bankruptcy mid-development, leading Broderbund to take over the project entirely; without the collaboration between the two studios to finalise the game, Baker considered the quality of the end product to be negatively affected. The release of the game was accompanied by a website where visitors could view daily comedic thoughts from the characters of the game (named 'Daily Enlightenment') and sample some of its puzzles.

== Critical reception ==
Reception

Review scores
Publication	Score
Computer Games Strategy Plus	3.5/5
Computer Gaming World	2.5/5
GameRevolution	B
GameSpot	7.8/10
Joystick	68%
Next Generation	3/5
Just Adventure	F−
Online Gaming Review	8/10
The Age	4/5

Critics generally found Koala Lumpur well-written and amusing. Computer Games Strategy Plus believed that the game's one-liners, "subtle barbs" and "zen-based pondering" of its cast were entertaining. Some critics also felt the plot was bizarre or incoherent, with Online Gaming Review finding it "funny and enjoyable", but "little more than filler to build an adventure game around". Critics were divided on the voice acting: some found them well-done, and others did not, describing the accents of the characters as confusing, irritating or stereotypical. Describing its humour as "strained and scatological", Computer Gaming World found its plot to be bizarre and unengaging, its dialog as "more annoying than amusing" and "rather lame" in its "attempts at being much hipper and funnier than it actually is".

The game's visual design was praised, and compared to that of a comic book, with Computer Gaming World considering it to be unique, "richly textured" and a highlight of the game. Some outlets considered that its cartoon style could be mistaken for a children's game, or may deter an adult audience. Some reviewers found the interface and navigation scheme noteworthy, with the Oakland Tribune stating that the "smooth, unobstructed movement" was impressive and made the game more interactive. The puzzle design of Koala Lumpur received mixed assessments. Some critics described them as too tedious or difficult, particularly the pipe mazes and laser puzzles, with Next Generation writing that whilst some were inventive, others did not "follow any visual or historical cues". Similarly, Just Adventure felt the game ranged "from ridiculously easy to incomprehensible", writing that the repetition of the laser puzzles was "sheer misery".

Animation World Magazine named Koala Lumpur as one of the best games of 1997. Comparing the game to the Sam & Max series of adventure games, Ron Welch of TechRaptor retrospectively praised the game's unique design and gameplay, considering its visuals were "timeless" and a "treat for the eyes", and the puzzles "some of the most interesting I've seen in an adventure game".
