= 2013 Washington Initiative 522 =

Ballot measure in Washington that would have required foods containing GMOs to be labeled

Initiative 522
- Concerns Labeling of Genetically-engineered Foods

Results
Choice	Votes	%
Yes	857,511	48.91%
No	895,557	51.09%
Total votes	1,753,068	100.00%
County results
Yes:
50–60%
60–70%
No:
50–60%
60–70%
70–80%
80–90%

Washington Initiative 522 (I-522) "concerns labeling of genetically-engineered foods" and was a 2012 initiative to the Washington State Legislature. As certified by the Washington Secretary of State, it achieved enough signatures to be forwarded to the legislature for consideration during the 2013 session. The legislature did not vote on the initiative, so I-522 advanced to the November 5, 2013 general election ballot. If passed into law by voters, I-522 would have taken effect on July 1, 2015. The initiative failed with 51% opposition.

If approved, I-522 would have required that non-exempt foods and agricultural products offered for retail sale state "clearly and conspicuously" on the front of the package if they were genetically-engineered, contain or might have contained genetically-engineered ingredients.

With more than $17.1 million in donations opposed before September 30, I-522 set a new record for money spent against a state initiative, exceeding the $12.35 million spent in 2011 to oppose Initiative 1183, privatizing liquor sales. By late October, No On I-522 had set the all-time record for any initiative campaign with $21 million. Combined contributions of $27.7 million are still less than $32.5 million spent by both sides around I-1183.

== Ballot title and summary ==
As described by the Secretary of State's office, the measure "would require most raw agricultural commodities, processed foods, and seeds and seed stocks, if produced using genetic engineering as defined, to be labeled as genetically engineered when offered for retail sale."

According to the official ballot measure summary,

This measure would require foods produced entirely or partly with genetic engineering, as defined, to be labeled as genetically engineered when offered for retail sale in Washington, beginning in July 2015. The labeling requirement would apply generally to raw agricultural commodities, processed foods, and seeds and seed stock, with some exceptions, but would not require that specific genetically-engineered ingredients be identified. The measure would authorize state enforcement and civil penalties, and allow private enforcement actions.

Full text of the measure is available online at the Washington state website.

== Provisions ==
I-522 is approximately nine pages long and adds a new chapter to Title 70 of the Revised Code of Washington.

Section one includes more than three pages stating various reasons for the initiative, related to consumer choice, religious belief, consumer health concerns, environmental concerns, economic concerns and worldwide trends in consumer labeling laws. This section explains that 49 countries, including many significant US trading partners Japan, South Korea, China, Australia, Russia and the European Union have labeling requirement for genetically engineered foods. This section asserts that labeling will give Washington's foods a share of the multibillion-dollar lost market opportunity in exports to these countries.

Section two establishes various definitions, including section 2(3)(a) which strictly defines "genetically engineered" by specific genetic engineering techniques, and differentiated from selective breeding. These specific genetic engineering techniques include various recombinant DNA and RNA methods such as micro-injection, electroporation, micro-encapsulation, liposome fusion, protoplast fusion or other "hybridization techniques that overcome natural physiological, reproductive or recombination barriers, where the donor cells or protoplasts do not fall within the same taxonomic family, in a way that does not occur by natural multiplication or natural recombination."

Section three requires that "any food offered for retail sale" be labeled "clearly and conspicuously" if it contains genetically-engineered ingredients, with certain exceptions. Exemptions consistent with current federal regulations include prepared foods such as those coming from a restaurant, meat from animals fed genetically engineered feeds, alcoholic beverages and foods processed with GE enzymes. For non-exempt foods, it would require "on the front of the package" the words "genetically engineered," "produced with genetic engineering," "partially produced with genetic engineering" or "may be partially produced with genetic engineering" stated "clearly and conspicuously."

Section four authorizes the Washington State Department of Health to "adopt rules necessary to implement" the law, with section five authorizing civil penalties for violations, section six noting that I-522 creates a new chapter for RCW Title 70 and section seven a basic severability clause.

== Support ==
Support for the I-522 was coordinated by YES on 522, a group that included food activists, small-scale producers and several food co-operatives such as PCC Natural Markets and natural food stores such as Whole Foods Market. It was also promoted by the Organic Consumers Association, which called for a boycott on Safeway Inc. unless the grocery store company would withdraw from the Grocery Manufacturers Association and contribute financially to the Yes on 522 campaign. In addition to being the single largest donor, Dr Bronner's Magic Soaps issued a special label in support of I-522.

Other support came from labor groups including the Washington State Labor Council. The Yes on 522 web page for endorsements lists over 350 businesses, 25 seafood groups, 150 farms, more than 100 other groups, 45 elected officials and many individuals. As of mid-October, 2013, reported campaign donations showed more than 13,000 donors for I-522 giving $6.2 million with a median donation of approximately $25.

== Opposition ==
Opposition to I-522 came primarily from large chemical corporations (Monsanto Company, DuPont Pioneer, Dow AgroSciences LLC, and Bayer CropScience), and organizations such as Washington Friends of Farms and Forests, Northwest Food Processors, Washington Association of Wheat Growers, the Washington State Farm Bureau and the Grocery Manufacturers Association, who rallied and mounted a $46 million campaign via Nestle SA, General Mills Inc., Coca-Cola Co and PepsiCo Inc to defeat the initiative. These large donations have reportedly "shattered" previous fundraising records against any other initiative, a full month ahead of the election.

Opponents of I-522 cited the editorial boards of fifteen different newspapers as opposing the initiative. As of mid-October, 2013, reported campaign donations showed ten donors for I-522 giving $17.2 million with a median donation of approximately $545,827.

== Donors ==
Public records of initiative donations are listed at the Washington State Public Disclosure Commission website.

Dr Bronner's Magic Soap Company was the largest donor in support, and the only pro-522 donor giving more than $1 million. The largest donation in opposition was $7.2 million of opposition money was identified as coming from the Grocery Manufacturers Association (GMA), details of which emerged after Washington state attorney general Bob Ferguson filed charges against them for violation of state campaign-finance laws. As of October 25, 2013, GMA had reportedly given $11 million in total.

In 2022, GMA (renamed the Consumer Brands Association) paid $9 million to settle the charges, and apologized for the violations.

State law requires the top five contributors to be listed. As of October 23, 2013 the largest contributors in support of I-522 are Dr Bronner's Magic Soaps, Organic Consumer Fund Committee to Label GMOs in WA State, Joseph Mercola, Presence Marketing Inc, and Nature's Path Foods USA. The top five contributors in opposition to I-522 are the Grocery Manufacturers Association, Monsanto Company, DuPont Pioneer, Dow AgroSciences LLC, and Bayer CropScience.

== Results ==
Initiative 522 failed with 51% voting against.

2013 Washington Initiative 522
Choice	Votes	%
For	857,511	48.91
Against	895,557	51.09
Total	1,753,068	100.00
Source: Washington Secretary of State

=== By county ===
County results
County	No		Yes		Margin		Total votes
County	#	%	#	%	#	%	Total votes
Adams	2,325	79.81%	588	20.19%	1,737	59.63%	2,913
Asotin	4,294	67.85%	2,035	32.15%	2,259	35.69%	6,329
Benton	30,892	72.95%	11,453	27.05%	19,439	45.91%	42,345
Chelan	13,146	67.08%	6,451	32.92%	6,695	34.16%	19,597
Clallam	12,304	49.90%	12,355	50.10%	-51	-0.21%	24,659
Clark	51,757	56.65%	39,602	43.35%	12,155	13.30%	91,359
Columbia	1,135	78.49%	311	21.51%	824	56.98%	1,446
Cowlitz	13,874	61.79%	8,578	38.21%	5,296	23.59%	22,452
Douglas	6,633	73.24%	2,423	26.76%	4,210	46.49%	9,056
Ferry	1,244	52.87%	1,109	47.13%	135	5.74%	2,353
Franklin	9,233	74.45%	3,168	25.55%	6,065	48.91%	12,401
Garfield	801	81.90%	177	18.10%	624	63.80%	978
Grant	12,027	75.27%	3,951	24.73%	8,076	50.54%	15,978
Grays Harbor	10,391	57.75%	7,601	42.25%	2,790	15.51%	17,992
Island	14,340	50.27%	14,186	49.73%	154	0.54%	28,526
Jefferson	5,698	39.06%	8,889	60.94%	-3,191	-21.88%	14,587
King	220,308	40.45%	324,382	59.55%	-104,074	-19.11%	544,690
Kitsap	37,475	49.60%	38,072	50.40%	-597	-0.79%	75,547
Kittitas	6,549	61.35%	4,125	38.65%	2,424	22.71%	10,674
Klickitat	3,768	60.66%	2,444	39.34%	1,324	21.31%	6,212
Lewis	13,112	62.63%	7,823	37.37%	5,289	25.26%	20,935
Lincoln	2,996	76.92%	899	23.08%	2,097	53.84%	3,895
Mason	10,101	56.72%	7,706	43.28%	2,395	13.45%	17,807
Okanogan	6,438	60.26%	4,245	39.74%	2,193	20.53%	10,683
Pacific	3,981	56.24%	3,097	43.76%	884	12.49%	7,078
Pend Oreille	2,592	60.27%	1,709	39.73%	883	20.53%	4,301
Pierce	98,657	54.78%	81,440	45.22%	17,217	9.56%	180,097
San Juan	2,636	35.30%	4,831	64.70%	-2,195	-29.40%	7,467
Skagit	18,262	51.35%	17,302	48.65%	960	2.70%	35,564
Skamania	1,618	56.67%	1,237	43.33%	381	13.35%	2,855
Snohomish	83,157	48.32%	88,928	51.68%	-5,771	-3.35%	172,085
Spokane	72,714	60.34%	47,797	39.66%	24,917	20.68%	120,511
Stevens	7,923	56.21%	6,173	43.79%	1,750	12.41%	14,096
Thurston	34,523	48.28%	36,982	51.72%	-2,459	-3.44%	71,505
Wahkiakum	1,113	61.29%	703	38.71%	410	22.58%	1,816
Walla Walla	10,039	70.58%	4,185	29.42%	5,854	41.16%	14,224
Whatcom	32,058	46.50%	36,878	53.50%	-4,820	-6.99%	68,936
Whitman	6,777	71.96%	2,641	28.04%	4,136	43.92%	9,418
Yakima	28,666	72.20%	11,035	27.80%	17,631	44.41%	39,701
Totals	895,557	51.09%	857,511	48.91%	38,046	2.17%	1,753,068

== See also ==
- California Proposition 37 (2012)
- Genetically modified food
- Selective breeding
