= Get a Haircut =

1993 single by George Thorogood & the Destroyers

Single by George Thorogood & the Destroyers

from the album Haircut
- Released: July 20, 1993
- Genre: Blues rock
- Length: 4:12
- Label: EMI USA
- Songwriters: Bill Birch; David Avery
- Producer: Terry Manning

George Thorogood & the Destroyers singles chronology
"Louie to Frisco" (1992)	"Get a Haircut" (1993)	"Gone Dead Train" (1993)

"Get a Haircut" is a rock song by American blues rock band George Thorogood & the Destroyers. It was the lead single from their 1993 album Haircut. The song was written by Bill Birch and David Avery. It peaked at No. 2 on the US Album Rock Tracks chart on August 28, 1993, and became a top-30 hit in both Australia (No. 28) and New Zealand (No. 15).

"Get a Haircut" has since become one of Thorogood's signature songs and has become a staple of classic rock radio. The music video for this song was animated by David Feiss, the creator of the Cartoon Network animated series Cow and Chicken and I Am Weasel.

== Background ==
Thorogood recalls being at a club with his band in Australia watching some of the performers, who performed "Get a Haircut". He liked the song and asked them who wrote it. Thorogood and the rest of the band had left Australia, while bassist Billy Blough had stayed another day. When he returned, he brought a copy of the single with him. Thorogood has been playing the song for a long time, but first recorded it for the Haircut album in 1992 because he had trouble getting the riff down in the studio.

== Release ==
"Get a Haircut" was released on July 20, 1993 as the lead single from their ninth studio album Haircut. The song debuted at No. 16, and peaked at No. 2 on the Album Rock Tracks chart. "Get a Haircut" was the No. 1 most played song in Canada on FM radio.

== Charts ==
Chart (1993)	Peak position
Australia (ARIA)	28
Canada Top Singles (RPM)	43
New Zealand (RIANZ)	15
US Album Rock Tracks (Billboard)	2

== Release history ==
Region	Date	Format(s)	Label(s)	Ref.
United States	1993	Cassette	EMI USA	
Australia	August 2, 1993	CD; cassette	EMI USA	
