= Teknekron Corporation =

- Type: Private
- Founded: 1968; 58 years ago
- Headquarters: Incline Village, Nevada, United States
- Website: teknekroncorp.com

Teknekron Corporation is one of the world's first technology-focused business incubators.

Teknekron was founded in Berkeley, California, in 1968 by Harvey Wagner and several UC Berkeley professors, including George Turin, D.Sc., a professor of electrical engineering and computer sciences who served as vice president of technology. By 1991 it had grown to $225 million in revenue, a 40% annual rate of growth.

The company is registered in the tax shelter of Incline Village in Nevada. Although Wagner had a small office there near his Lake Tahoe house, most of the company's operations are in Berkeley, the San Francisco Peninsula, and the Dallas–Fort Worth area.

== Theoretical and policy research ==
During the 1960s and 1970s, Teknekron was awarded numerous research contracts by the U.S. government, including the transfer of technology from NASA's space program to civilian uses, the dispersal modeling and generation forecasts of noxious gases from power generation, urban effects of drought in San Francisco, mental health services in California, durability of manufactured goods, and public perceptions of highway safety.

Contracted research for private clients included Workers' compensation. Some of Teknekron's research was performed in partnership with UC Berkeley.

The stated goal of the company is: "New Teknekron ventures do not take the traditional course of developing, from the outset, a standard product for the end-user market. Instead, they concentrate on developing products for inclusion in other, generally larger companies' product lines, and on delivering customized integrated systems for such companies' internal use. It is only after years of working with client companies on specific projects that a Teknekron enterprise might condense its market-honed technologies into generic "core products." This market approach has distinguished us from venture- capital partnerships, which tend to focus on funding companies that ab initio develop products for the end-user market."

== Incubated businesses ==
By 1991 four companies had been spun out as separate public companies or sold off, one had failed and six were running as "affiliate companies."

- IEX Corporation, bought by Tekelec in 1999 for $163 million
- Integrated Automation, bought by Litton Industries
- Teknekron Energy Resource Analysts Corporation (TERA Corp)
- Teknekron Communications Systems Inc., renamed TCSI in 1995 and bought by Rocket Software in 2003
- Teknekron Financial Services, absorbed by Computer Sciences Corporation
- Teknekron Infoswitch, bought by Greenwich Street Capital Partners in 1999.
- Teknekron Sensor Development Corp, a manufacturer of scanning probe microscopy components
- Teknekron Software Systems, bought by Reuters in 1993 for $125.1 million now known as TIBCO Software.

== Partnerships ==
Teknekron partnered with external firms as well. In 1991 it signed a co-marketing agreement with the Belgian microelectronics research partnership Interuniversity Microelectronics Centre.
