= Jeff Harmening =

President and CEO of General Mills

Jeffrey L. Harmening is president and chief executive officer (CEO) of General Mills, having taken over from Ken Powell in June 2017. He was chief operating officer (COO) of General Mills from July 2016 to May 2017. As CEO of General Mills, Harmening has made sustainability a priority, with the goal of advancing regenerative agriculture.

Harmening earned a bachelor's degree from DePauw University (1989), and an MBA from Harvard Business School (1994). He is a member of The Business Council.
