= Ripple Crisp =

Breakfast cereal made by General Mills

Ripple Crisp was a breakfast cereal produced by General Mills. It was introduced in 1993, and consisted of corn flakes made with horizontal ridges. According to the marketing, the ridges were designed to "keep out the milk and lock in the flavor for a crisp, delicious taste in milk", while traditional flake cereals "were flat. Milk just sat on them, making them soggy." Ripple Crisp was promoted with the slogan "The Shape Of Flakes To Come!" The cereal came in two flavors, "Golden Corn" and "Honey Bran". A collection of consumer reviews from Deseret News summarized the cereal as being "tall on crunch, short on taste". General Mills' official Twitter account recognized the cereal in a 2013 tweet.
