= Monster cereals =

Breakfast cereal brands in North America

Count Chocula
- The 2025 box design for Count Chocula breakfast cereal

Chocolate-flavored corn cereal bits and marshmallows
- Mascot: Cartoon variation of Count Dracula
- Introduced: 1971; 55 years ago
- Availability: Still in production (Seasonally since 2010)
- Tagline: I want to eat your cereal! (1971–2010)

Franken Berry
- The 2025 box design for Franken Berry breakfast cereal

Strawberry-flavored corn cereal bits and marshmallows
- Mascot: Cartoon variation of Frankenstein's monster
- Introduced: 1971; 55 years ago
- Availability: Still in production (Seasonally since 2010)

Boo Berry
- The 2025 box design for Boo Berry breakfast cereal

Blueberry-flavored frosted corn cereal bits and marshmallows
- Mascot: Blue cartoon ghost
- Introduced: 1973; 53 years ago
- Availability: Still in production (Seasonally since 2010)

Frute Brute
- The latest box redesign for Frute Brute breakfast cereal (originally Fruit Brute)

Frosted fruit-flavored cereal with lime-flavored marshmallows; Relaunch: Sweetened cherry-flavored cereal with marshmallows
- Mascot: Cartoon variation of the Wolf Man
- Introduced: 1974; 52 years ago
- Availability: Discontinued (1982); Relaunch (2013); Discontinued (2014); Relaunch and Discontinued (2022) (In a box of four Monster Cereals)
- Tagline: The Howling Good Taste of Fruit

Fruity Yummy Mummy
- The latest box redesign for Fruity Yummy Mummy breakfast cereal

Frosted fruit-flavored cereal with vanilla-flavored marshmallows Relaunch: Frosted orange-cream flavored cereal with marshmallows
- Mascot: Cartoon variation of the Mummy
- Introduced: 1987; 39 years ago
- Availability: Discontinued (1992); Relaunch (2013); Discontinued (2014)
- Tagline: Yummy Mummy makes your tummy go yummy! Heh, heh, heh! (1988–1990)

Carmella Creeper
- The latest box design for Carmella Creeper breakfast cereal

Caramel apple-flavored corn cereal bits and marshmallows
- Mascot: Cartoon variation of a zombie DJ
- Introduced: 2023; 3 years ago
- Availability: Discontinued (2024)

Monster Mash
- The box design for Monster Mash breakfast cereal

Artificial combination of chocolate, strawberry, blueberry, and fruit-flavored corn cereal bits and marshmallows
- Mascots: Cartoon variations of Count Dracula, Frankenstein's monster, a ghost, the Wolf Man, and the Mummy.
- Introduced: 2021; 5 years ago
- Availability: Discontinued (2022)
- Tagline: 50 Years of Monster Cereals (2021-2022)

Monster Mash Remix
- The box design for Monster Mash Remix breakfast cereal

Artificial combination of chocolate, strawberry, blueberry, fruit, and caramel apple-flavored corn cereal bits and marshmallows
- Mascots: Cartoon variations of Count Dracula, Frankenstein's monster, a ghost, the Wolf Man, the Mummy, and a zombie DJ.
- Introduced: 2023; 3 years ago
- Availability: Discontinued (2023)
- Tagline: A mix of all six Monsters Cereals flavors (2023)

Monsters' Frightful Friends
- The box design for Monsters' Frightful Friends cereal

Artificial berry cereal bits and marshmallows
- Mascots: Cartoon variations of Count Dracula, Frankenstein's monster, a ghost, and a zombie DJ.
- Introduced: 2024; 2 years ago
- Availability: Discontinued (2024)
- Tagline: A mix of all four Monsters Cereals flavors (2024)

The monster cereals are a seasonal line of breakfast cereals produced by General Mills in North America. Since the line was introduced in 1971, it has been associated with three enduring brands: Count Chocula, Franken Berry, and Boo Berry. The brands Frute Brute (originally Fruit Brute) and Yummy Mummy have had more limited production and availability. The Carmella Creeper brand was introduced in 2023.

== History ==
In March 1971, the first two cereals in the line were introduced, the chocolate-flavored Count Chocula and the strawberry-flavored Franken Berry. In the commercials, the two monsters, Count Alfred Chocula and Franken Berry, would engage in comic bickering over which cereal was better, when something or someone else interfered in their verbal sparring and scared them.

In February 1972, Franken Berry cereal included an indigestible pigment that turned some children's feces pink, a symptom sometimes referred to as "Franken Berry stool". The Count Chocula and Franken Berry recipes were reformulated to remove this pigment.

Boo Berry, the first blueberry-flavored cereal, was released in December 1972 (released nationally in February 1973), and Fruit Brute in 1974. Fruit Brute was discontinued by 1982. It was replaced in 1987 by Fruity Yummy Mummy, which was discontinued in 1992. During this period, Fruit Brute made conspicuous appearances in two films by Quentin Tarantino, Pulp Fiction and Reservoir Dogs, as a visual easter egg.

Starting in 1993, General Mills changed the recipe in the cereals from a base of oat and corn meal to corn meal only. This altered the flavor and texture significantly.

In 2005, Count Chocula was shown in MasterCard's "Icons" commercial during Super Bowl XXXIX, where many famous advertising mascots are seen having dinner together. In 2010, Betty Crocker released Franken Berry, Frute Brute, and Boo Berry Fruit Roll-Ups. General Mills released Count Chocula cereal bars.

Since 2010, Franken Berry, Boo Berry, and Count Chocula cereals have been manufactured and sold only for a few months during the autumn/Halloween season in September and October. As of late 2010, information such as nutrition data and historical facts can still be found on the official General Mills website at all times of the year.

In August 2013, General Mills released all five monster cereals for purchase during the Halloween season. The renamed Frute Brute was being released for the first time in 31 years, while Fruity Yummy Mummy was being released for the first time in 21 years, both receiving updated packaging like the other cereals. Additionally, special retro edition boxes of all five cereals in their original packaging art were sold exclusively at Target stores.

In 2014, General Mills enlisted the help of DC Comics to create new designs for the cereals in time for that Halloween. The designs, revealed on August 6, consisted of a Boo Berry design by Jim Lee, a Count Chocula design by Terry Dodson and a Franken Berry design by Dave Johnson.

In 2021, it was announced that the company would celebrate the 50th anniversary of the introduction of the Monster Cereals by releasing an amalgamated cereal entitled Monster Mash.

In August 2022, due to the resounding success of the 50th anniversary celebrations just one year prior, Frute Brute returned, and the covers of all four cereals that year featured artwork by street artist KAWS inspired by the vintage designs.

In March 2024, KAWS launched a collection of four figurines representing these monsters, Count Chocula, Boo Berry, Frute Brute and Franken Berry following the collaboration with General Mills in August 2022. These figurines are bigger than those found in cereal boxes, but retain the artwork design. In May of the same year, General Mills revealed a new integration animal characters (old and new) collectively named the Monsters' Frightful Friends. These additions will serve as the pets of the titular monsters including: Igor the guard-spider, Bennie the Franken-bat, Meow Berry the ghost cat, and Scratch the snake; each of which are the animal companions to Count Chocula, Franken Berry, Boo Berry, and Carmella Creeper, respectively. The new additions to the Halloween-themed breakfast cereals, will also be integrated into cereal-marshmallows in the shape of these pets.

In July 2025, the box art for Count Chocula, Franken Berry and Boo Berry was reimagined with the characters as puppets created by the Jim Henson Company. The puppets also appeared in advertising, and merchandising featuring these versions of the characters was made available from the Henson online store. Box designs featuring the Jim Henson puppets were refreshed in July 2026 for the 55th anniversary of the Monsters Cereals line.

== Prizes ==
Until the early 1980s, the monster cereals were also known for their wide variety of both in-pack and mail-away cereal premiums. Many items, such as posters, stickers, paint sets, speedster cars, parachutes, and even vinyl advertising figures, were produced. In 1979, three flexi discs, thin phonograph records, were made available via cereal boxes: "The Monsters Go Disco", "Count Chocula Goes to Hollywood" and "Monster Adventures in Outer Space".

== See also ==
- List of breakfast cereal advertising characters
- List of breakfast cereals
