= Wanchai Ferry (brand) =

American brand of Chinese food dinner kits

Wanchai Ferry is a brand of Chinese food dinner kits founded in Hong Kong by Chong Kin-wo and now owned by American company General Mills. The company's roots began in 1972 when Chong Kin-wo – often known as Madame Chong – began selling dumplings, a business that led to her "dumpling queen" nickname and the 1985 establishment of the Wanchai Ferry Peking Dumpling Company. In 1997, Pillsbury Company entered a joint venture with Wanchai Ferry which led the brand to become part of General Mills when Pillsbury was acquired in 2001.

The brand is still largely a frozen dumpling company in China and a leader in its market. The dinner kits are intended for the American and European markets. In her later years, Madame Chong served as a consultant to General Mills involved in the final development stages and approving the flavors. The kits were introduced to France in Spring of 2007 and to the United States in Summer 2007. In 2009, the company introduced frozen dinners.

Chong Kin-wo died on February 12, 2019, at the age of 75. Her biographical movie titled The Dumpling Queen premiered in Mainland China on April 30, 2025, and in the United States on May 2, 2025.
