= Wanzai =

Wanzai may refer to the following places:

- Mandarin Pinyin spelling for Wan Chai, an area of Hong Kong Island
- Mandarin Pinyin spelling for Wan Tsai, a peninsula of Hong Kong
- Wanzai, an island in Zhuhai, Guangdong
- Wanzai County, Yichun, Jiangxi
