= 1-800-MUSIC-NOW =

1-800 MUSIC NOW was a short-lived venture by MCI Communications to open a music store operated through automated telephone prompts. It also introduced the first ever serious attempt at an e-commerce music store. The service was run out of MCI's Consumer Markets Headquarters offices in Arlington, Virginia (Pentagon City).

== History ==
The telephone service allowed United States users who dialed the toll-free number 1-800-687-4266 to enter the name of a performing artist by touch-tone, then select one of that artist's albums (available on CD or cassette) from the catalog and hear clips from that album before buying by credit card. Users could sample and buy music and could shop by artist name, album name, genre, song title, Top 10 lists, etc. Once users made selections on the automated service, they were transferred to a call center where an operator established an account (for first-time buyers), collected payment and shipping information, assisted in ordering, and completed the order. Subsequent ordering could be accomplished through the automated system without human assistance.

The online service was located at http://www.1800musicnow.mci.com. It was the first to offer free music sampling for most of its catalog—initially in RealAudio 1.0 and eventually in RealAudio 2.0. The online store shut down in early 1997.

The service began in 1995 (the same year Amazon.com opened, and three years before it started selling music) but was taken down by the end of 1996. The promotion totaled about $40 million (at the time, advertisements for the service were quite regularly played on MTV and advertised heavily as part of The Simpsons Homerpalooza episode); meanwhile, its top-selling CD sold only 400 copies. Ultimately, over 1 million pieces of music were sold within the year. One survey noted that many of those who called the number did not sign up to make purchases, some citing shipping fees, but most saying it was because they didn't have credit cards.

1-800 MUSIC NOW was originally called 1-800 MY MUSIC. It was created by Steven Saslow and his partners at Diamond Creative Partners. As of today the number is no longer in service.
