= MCI Communications =

Former telecommunications and networking company

MCI Communications Corporation
- Formerly: Microwave Communications Inc. (1963-1968); Microwave Communications of America Inc. (1968-1971)
- Industry: Telecommunications
- Founded: October 3, 1963; 63 years ago
- Defunct: September 15, 1998; 28 years ago
- Fate: Acquired by WorldCom
- Successor: MCI WorldCom
- Headquarters: Washington, D.C., U.S.
- Key people: William G. McGowan
- Products: Conferencing, Contact Centers, Data and IP Services, Internet access, IT Solutions and Hosting, Managed Networks, Premises Equipment (CPE), Security, Voice, VoIP, Wireless
- Website: mci.com at the Wayback Machine (archived 1997-02-17)

MCI Communications Corporation (originally Microwave Communications, Inc.) was an American telecommunications company headquartered in Washington, D.C. that was at one point the second-largest long-distance provider in the United States.

MCI was instrumental in legal and regulatory changes that led to the breakup of the Bell System and introduced competition in the U.S. telephone industry. Its MCI Mail, launched in 1983, was one of the first Email services and its MCI.net was an integral part of the Internet backbone.

The company was acquired by WorldCom in 1998.

== History ==
=== Founding ===
MCI was founded as Microwave Communications, Inc. on October 3, 1963, with John D. Goeken being named the company's first president. The initial business plan was for the company to build a series of microwave radio relay stations between Chicago, Illinois, and St. Louis, Missouri. The relay stations would then be used to interface with limited-range two-way radios used by truckers along U.S. Route 66 or by barges on the Illinois Waterway. The long-distance communication service would then be marketed to shipping companies that were too small to build their own private relay systems. In addition to the radio relay services, MCI soon made plans to offer voice, computer information, and data communication services for business customers unable to afford AT&T's TELPAK service.

Hearings on the company's initial license application between February 13, 1967, and April 19, 1967, resulted in a recommendation of approval by the FCC.

On June 26, 1968, the FCC ruled in the Carterfone case that AT&T's rules prohibiting private two-way radio connections to a telephone network were illegal. AT&T quickly sought a reversal of the ruling, and when the FCC denied the request, AT&T brought suit against the FCC in the United States courts of appeals. The FCC's decision was upheld, thus creating a new industry: privately manufactured (non-Bell) devices could be connected to the telephone network as long as the manufacturer met interface standards.

In 1968, William G. McGowan, an investor from New York with experience in raising venture capital, made an investment into the company large enough to pay all outstanding debts and create a cash reserve. McGowan received a seat on the board of directors. Microwave Communications of America, Inc (MICOM) was incorporated on August 8, 1968 as an umbrella corporation to help build a nationwide microwave relay system.

=== Licensing and build-out ===
On October 28, 1968, Hyrum Rex Lee became an FCC Commissioner and MCI began a series of submissions including a proposal for a low-cost educational television network designed to show MCI as being more flexible to public needs than AT&T. While MCI was performing this lobbying, the President's Task Force on Communication Policy issued a report recommending that specialized common carriers be allowed free access into the private line business.

On 14 August 1969, the FCC issued a final ruling on Docket 16509, MCI's licensing request to begin building microwave relay stations between Chicago and St. Louis. By a decision of 4-to-3 MCI was licensed for operation. This ruling was quickly appealed by AT&T, and after a denial of the appeal by the commission, AT&T filed a civil suit with the United States courts of appeals to have the ruling overturned.

The company then began to form subsidiary corporations and file applications with the FCC to create microwave relays between other city pairs. Between September 1969 and February 1971, 15 new regional carriers were created, allowing for interconnection between several major cities in the United States.

In July 1969, MICOM purchased a participating interest in Interdata, an independent regional carrier that was applying to build a microwave relay chain between New York City and Washington, D.C.

MCI began selling data transmission services to paying customers on January 1, 1972.

To pay for the microwave transmission and relay equipment needed for build-out, MICOM began a series of private stock offerings in May 1971. In July 1971, MICOM was restructured into MCI Communications, and the company began the process of absorbing the regional carriers into a single corporation.

MCI became a public company via an initial public offering on June 22, 1972, trading on the National Association of Securities Dealers Automated Quotation System (NASDAQ) under the stock ticker MCIC.

In early 1971, MCI and Lockheed Missiles and Space Company created a joint venture which was the first company to request FCC authorization as a Specialized Common Carrier using satellite-based communications; satellite service would save the company from building thousands of miles of terrestrial network facilities. A year later, Comsat Corp. entered the venture which was renamed CML Satellite Corp. In need of cash, MCI sold its share of the venture to IBM in 1974. Lockheed also subsequently sold its share to IBM. IBM and Comsat brought in Aetna as a third partner and renamed the company Satellite Business Systems (SBS). IBM later acquired the remainder of the company and sold it back to MCI in March 1986 for $376 million in MCI stock.

Illinois Bell refused to interconnect an MCI long haul interstate circuit and, in January 1974, MCI filed an antitrust lawsuit against AT&T. On June 13, 1980, a jury in Chicago awarded MCI $1.8 billion in damages to be paid by AT&T, reduced to $113 million in 1985 on appeal. The suit, coupled with the Department of Justice antitrust suit also brought against AT&T, eventually led to the voluntary breakup of the Bell System.

In 1975, as a result of the Carterfone decision, MCI began offering switched voice telecommunications in direct competition with AT&T, using a combination of its own microwave circuits and leased circuits from AT&T. By 1977, the company operated several switches manufactured by Danray (later part of Nortel).

MCI's logo from 1982 to 1996

In 1982, MCI worked with Ally & Gargano to create what Entertainment Weekly referred to in 1997 as one of the 50 best commercials of all time. MCI hired the same actors used in an AT&T commercial in 1981. In the AT&T version, the son calls his mother and, when asked why, replied “just ‘cuz I love you”, which was not a common reason to make an expensive long-distance call, causing the mother to cry. In the MCI version, when the husband asked the wife why she was crying, she replied "I just received my phone bill"... after which an announcer's voice stated "You're not talking too much, you're just paying too much. MCI: The Nation's New Long Distance Telephone Company."

In 1982, MCI acquired Western Union International, the cable systems properties and the right-of-way rights of Western Union's telegraph lines from Xerox for $185 million. Xerox had acquired it for $279 million in 1979. It was renamed MCI International and its headquarters were moved from New York City to Westchester County, New York.

On September 27, 1983, an MCI division led by Robert Harcharik with the help of Vint Cerf, one of the developers of the TCP/IP protocol, launched MCI Mail, one of the first email services, and a data network using the CCITT X.25 packet switching protocol.

In 1983, Michael Milken and Drexel Burnham Lambert raised a $1.1 billion hybrid security, at the time the largest debt financing in history, for the company.

In 1984, MCI became the first company to deploy single-mode optical fiber (the standard had been multi-mode optical fiber), which was manufactured by Siecor, a joint venture between Siemens Telecom and Corning Glass Company. Referred to as MAFOS (Mid-Atlantic Fiber Optic System), the fiber cable ran between New York City and Washington D.C. Eventually, single-mode fiber became the standard for US telecommunications carriers.

In 1987, MCI acquired RCA Global from General Electric.

In 1987, MCI partnered with IBM and Merit Network (a network run by triad of universities in Michigan) to respond to a National Science Foundation proposal to develop a high-speed telecommunications network called National Science Foundation Network (NSFNET). This network used the TCP/IP protocol that had been developed by the United States Department of Defense ARPANet and was the immediate forerunner to the Internet. In 1988, Vint Cerf was working at CNRI and obtained support from MCI and permission from the Federal Networking Council to interconnect MCI Mail with the NSFNET. In 1989, it was the first commercial e-mail service to do so. Immediately, most of the other commercial e-mail providers also got permission to interconnect to the Internet, leading to their interconnection with each other. In 1994, NSF announced that it would terminate the NSFNET operation and support the development of Network Access Point operation to link the networks that had been interconnected by NSFNET. NSF also proposed that an academic research network be built called the Very high-speed Backbone Network Service (vBNS) and MCI responded. MCI also built a separate commercial Internet service, MCI.net, which was an integral part of the global Internet backbone. It was sold to Cable & Wireless plc as part of the merger of MCI with Worldcom in 1998.

In 1990, the company acquired Telecom*USA and became the second-largest telecommunications company in the U.S., with a fiber-optic network spanning more than 46,000 miles. The company offered more than 50 services in more than 150 countries that included voice, data, and telex transmissions, MCI Mail, and MCI Fax.

In March 1991, the company introduced the Friends & Family plan, whereby customers received a reduced rate when calling numbers they had included in their "calling circle", which could contain up to 20 MCI customers.

In 1993, the company introduced a collect call service called "1-800-COLLECT". Actors Phil Hartman, Chris Rock, and Arsenio Hall starred in some of its commercials, but the most commonly used spokesperson was the fictional Eva Save-a-lot, played by actress Alyssa Milano. The service was sold to viiz in 2016.

In 1995, the company partnered with News Corporation on a satellite television venture, known as American Sky Broadcasting (named after Murdoch's UK DBS company). It intended to broadcast from two satellites at the 110 degree orbital slot; but the venture never started broadcasting. The orbital slot and an uplink center were sold to EchoStar in 1999; the planned satellites Tempo 1 and Tempo 2 were sold to PrimeStar, whose assets were sold to DirecTV in 1999.

Late in 1994, MCI re-hired Vint Cerf as SVP Engineering to build a commercial Internet backbone network (MCI.NET) and also undertook to build the very Broadband Network Service (vBNS) for the National Science Foundation after the National Science Foundation Network (NSFNET) was shut down.

In October 1994, BT Group acquired 20% of the company for $4.3 billion.

In November 1995, MCI introduced 1-800-MUSIC-NOW, a short-lived telephone-based and online music store.

== Purchase by WorldCom ==
BT made an offer to purchase the rest of the company in November 1996 for $22 billion. In October 1997, GTE, now a part of Verizon, made a bid to purchase MCI for $28 billion in cash. WorldCom offered $34.7 billion in stock, higher than either the BT or GTE offers, which was accepted by MCI on November 10, 1997. On September 15, 1998 the transaction was consummated and the merged company renamed MCI WorldCom. Two years later, the "MCI" part was dropped.

Following a major accounting scandal, WorldCom filed bankruptcy in 2002 and the company was renamed MCI Inc. upon its exit from bankruptcy in 2003. Before then, however, many executive posts were taken over by holdovers from the old MCI. After the name change, one of those executives said, "We're taking our company back."
