= General Mills =

American multinational food corporation

General Mills, Inc.
- Logo used since December 2017 (Note: The logo's "Big G" symbol has been in use since June 1963.)
- Formerly: Minneapolis Milling Company (1856–1877); Washburn-Crosby Company (1877–1928)
- Type: Public
- Traded as: NYSE: GIS; S&P 500 component
- Industry: Food processing
- Founded: 1856; 170 years ago (as Minneapolis Milling Company); 1877; 149 years ago (as Washburn-Crosby Company); 1928; 98 years ago (as General Mills) Minneapolis, Minnesota, US
- Founders: Robert Smith; Cadwallader C. Washburn; John Crosby; James Ford Bell
- Headquarters: Golden Valley, Minnesota, U.S.
- Area served: Worldwide
- Key people: Jeffrey Harmening (chairman and CEO)
- Products: Baking mixes, breakfast cereals, yogurt, refrigerated dough, soup, pizza, snack foods, ice cream, soy products, vegetables, flour, other food products
- Revenue: ▼US$19.86 billion (2024)
- Operating income: ▼US$3.432 billion (2024)
- Net income: ▼US$2.497 billion (2024)
- Total assets: ▲US$31.47 billion (2024)
- Total equity: ▼US$9.397 billion (2024)
- Number of employees: 34,000 (May 2024)
- Subsidiaries: Cereal Partners Worldwide (50%)
- Website: generalmills.com
- Footnotes; Financials as of fiscal year ended May 26, 2024. References

General Mills, Inc. is an American multinational manufacturer and marketer of branded consumer foods sold through retail stores. Founded on the banks of the Mississippi River at Saint Anthony Falls in Minneapolis, the company originally gained fame for being a large flour miller. It is headquartered in Golden Valley, Minnesota, a suburb of Minneapolis.

The company markets North American brands including Gold Medal flour, Annie's Homegrown, Lärabar, Cascadian Farm, Betty Crocker, Nature Valley, Totino's, Pillsbury, Old El Paso, Häagen-Dazs, as well as breakfast cereals under the General Mills name, including Cheerios, Wheaties, Chex, Lucky Charms, Trix, Cocoa Puffs, and the monster cereals.

== History ==
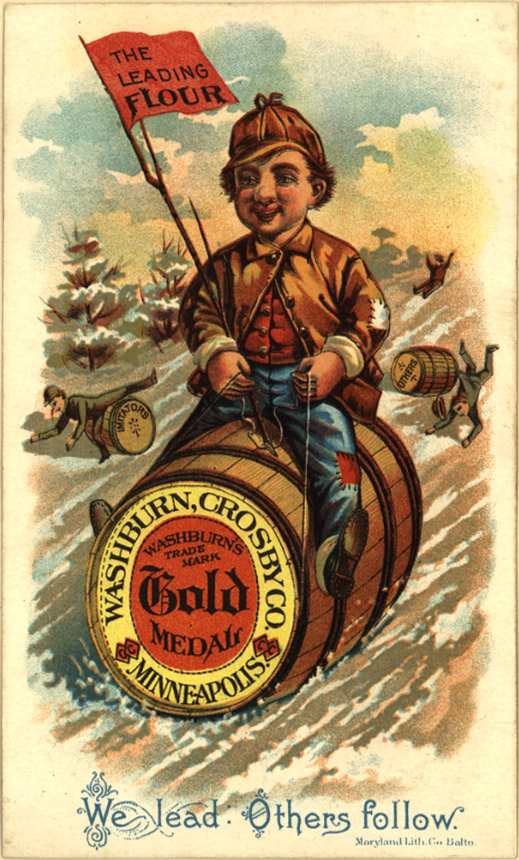
Advertisement, late 1880s

=== Washburn-Crosby Company ===
The company can trace its history to the Minneapolis Milling Company, incorporated in 1856. The company was founded by Illinois congressman Robert Smith, who leased power rights to flour mills operating along the west side of Saint Anthony Falls on the Mississippi River in Minneapolis, Minnesota. Cadwallader C. Washburn acquired the company shortly after its founding and hired his brother William D. Washburn to assist in the company's development. In 1866 the Washburns got into the business themselves, building the Washburn "B" Mill at the falls. At the time, the building was considered to be so large and output so vast that it could not possibly sustain itself. However, the company succeeded, and in 1874 he built the even bigger Washburn "A" Mill.

In 1877, the mill entered a partnership with John Crosby to form the Washburn-Crosby Company, producing winter wheat flour. That same year Washburn sent William Hood Dunwoody to England to open the market for spring wheat. Dunwoody was successful and became a silent partner.

In 1878, the "A" mill was destroyed in a flour dust explosion along with five nearby buildings, an event known as the Great Mill Disaster. The ensuing fire led to the death of 18 workers. Construction of a new mill began immediately. Not only was the new mill safer but it also was able to produce a higher quality flour after the old grinding stones were replaced with automatic steel rollers, the first ever used.

In 1880, Washburn-Crosby flour brands won gold, silver and bronze medals at the Millers' International Exhibition in Cincinnati, causing them to launch the Gold Medal flour brand.

In 1924, the company acquired a failing Twin Cities radio station, WLAG, renaming it WCCO (from Washburn-Crosby Company).

=== Founding as General Mills ===
General Mills itself was created on June 20, 1928, when Washburn-Crosby President James Ford Bell merged Washburn-Crosby with three other mills. In the same year, General Mills acquired the Wichita Mill and Elevator Company of the industrialist Frank Kell of Wichita Falls, Texas. With the sale, Kell acquired cash plus stock in the corporation.

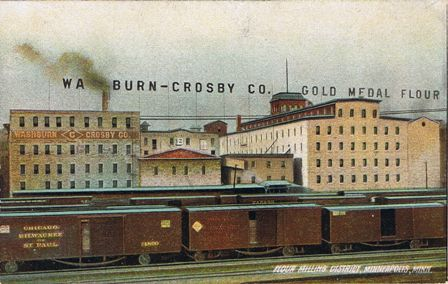
Postcard image of the Gold Medal Flour factory in Minneapolis c. 1900

Shares of the new company's stock were first sold on the New York Stock Exchange on November 30, 1928, at $65 per share. The newly merged company paid a dividend in 1928 and has continued the dividend uninterrupted ever since – one of only a few companies to pay a dividend every year since its founding.

=== Engineering milestones ===
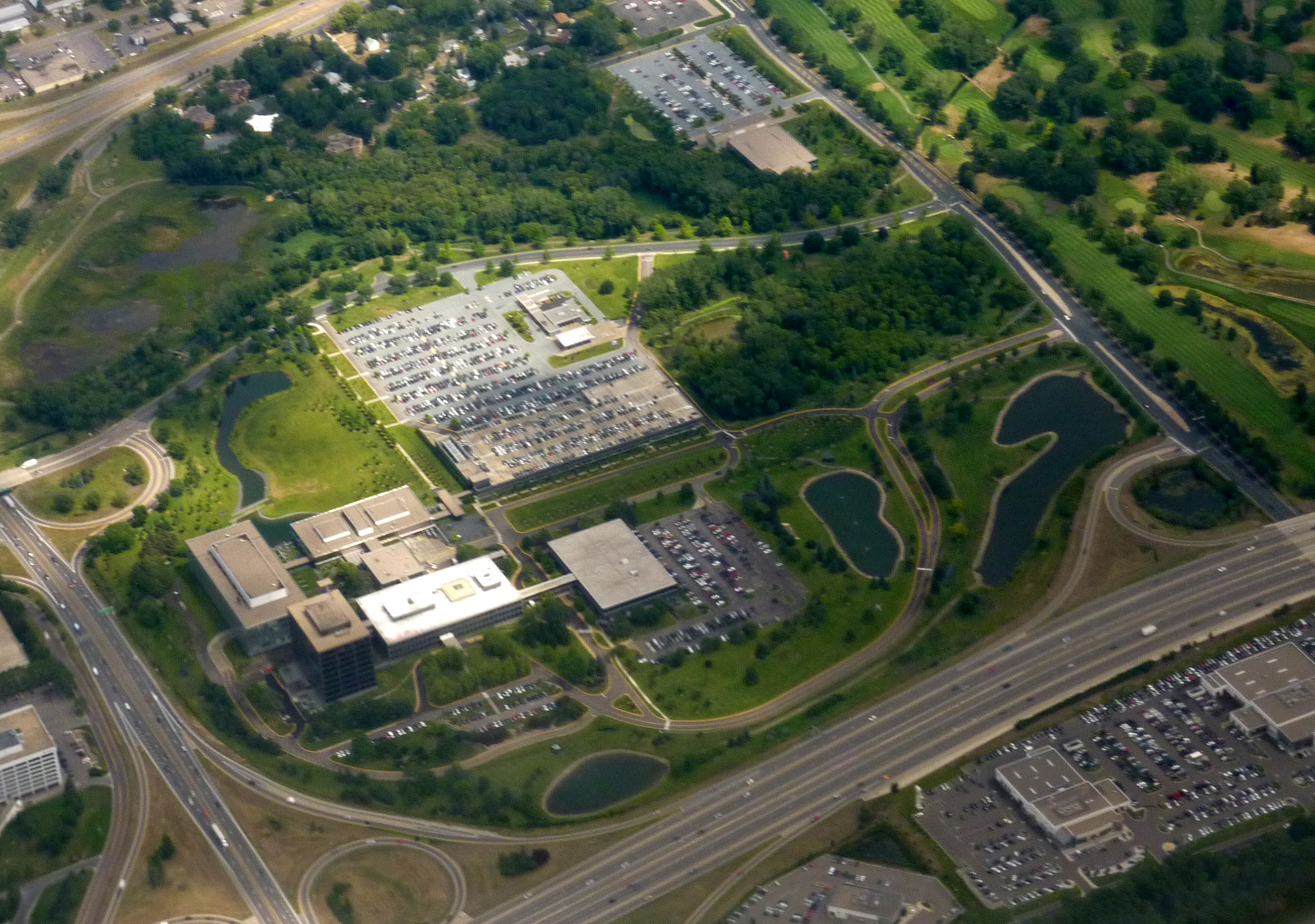
General Mills's corporate campus in Golden Valley, Minnesota

In the 1930s, General Mills engineer, Thomas R. James, created the puffing gun, which inflated or distorted cereal pieces into puffed-up shapes. This new technology was used in 1937 to create Kix cereal and in 1941 to create Cheerioats (known today as Cheerios). In 1939, General Mills engineer Helmer Anderson created the Anderson sealer. This new device allowed for bags of flour to be sealed with glue instead of just being tied with a string. In 1956, General Mills created the tear-strip for easily opening packages.

=== Aeronautical Research Division and Electronics Division ===
In 1946, General Mills established their Aeronautical Research Division with chief engineer Otto C. Winzen. This division developed high altitude balloons in conjunction with the United States Navy Office of Naval Research (ONR), such as the Skyhook balloon.

In 1956, hundreds of General Mills balloons carrying reconnaissance equipment were launched by the United States government under Project Genetrix to surveil Eastern bloc countries, in particular their nuclear capabilities.

The aeronautical work of General Mills done around the time of the Second World War was continued by Raven Industries.

The General Mills Electronics division developed the DSV Alvin submersible, which is notable for being used in investigating the wreck of Titanic among other deep-sea exploration missions.

=== Merchandising and television ===
Beginning in 1929, General Mills products contained box top coupons, known as Betty Crocker coupons, with varying point values, which were redeemable for discounts on a variety of housewares products featured in the widely distributed Betty Crocker catalog. The coupons and the catalog were discontinued by the company in 2006.

General Mills became the sponsor of the popular radio show The Lone Ranger in 1941. The show was then brought to television, and, after 20 years, their sponsorship came to an end in 1961.

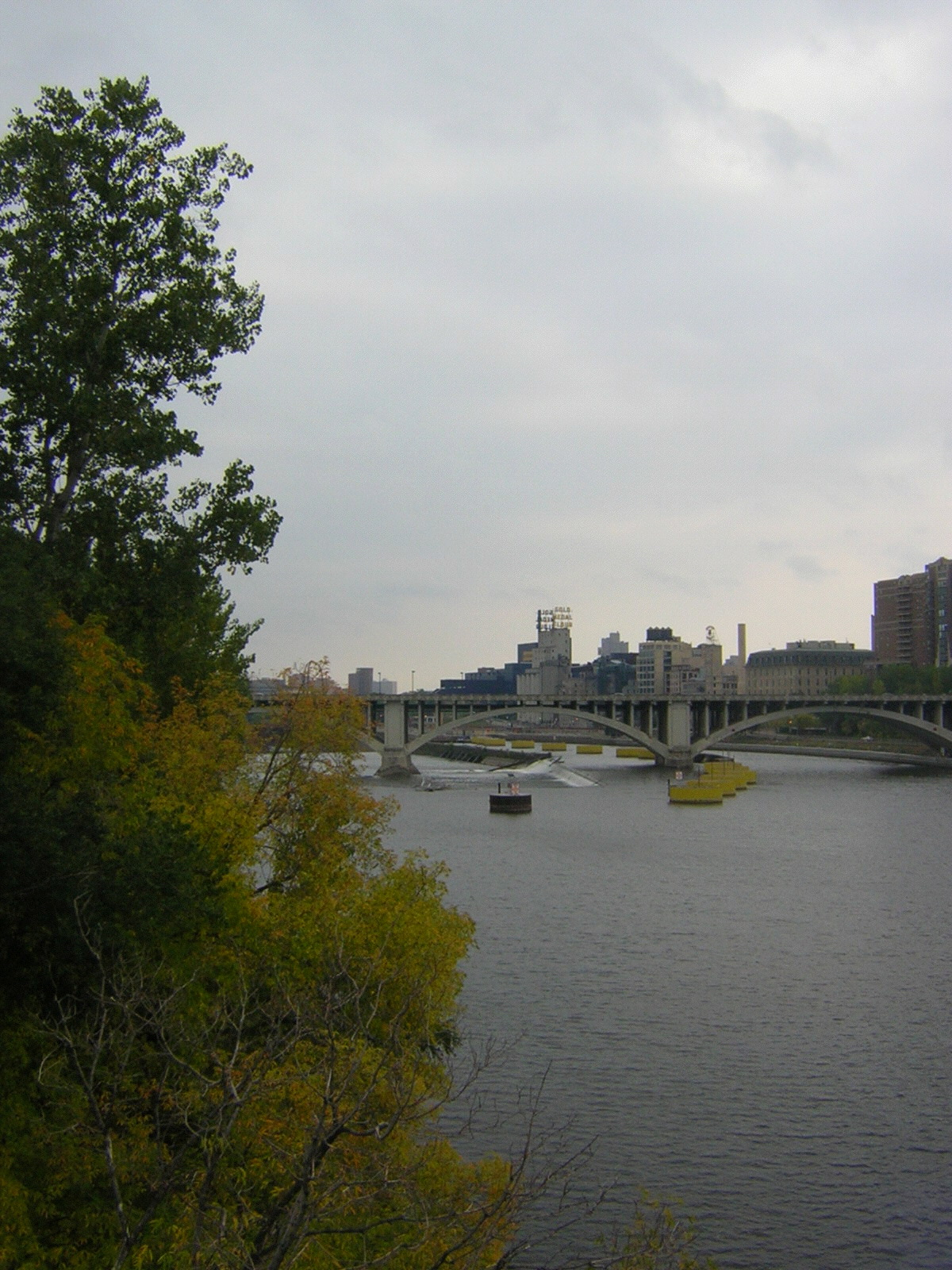
Former site of General Mills as of 2008 on the Mississippi River at Minneapolis

Beginning in 1959, General Mills sponsored the Rocky and His Friends television series, later known as The Bullwinkle Show. Until 1968, Rocky and Bullwinkle were featured in a variety of advertisements for General Mills. General Mills was also a sponsor of the Saturday-morning cartoons from the Total Television productions studio, including Tennessee Tuxedo. The company also was a sponsor of the ABC western series The Life and Legend of Wyatt Earp, starring Hugh O'Brian. The company, along with its subsidiary The Program Exchange, backed DiC Entertainment in syndicating the Dennis the Menace animated series based on the comic strip of the same name created by Hank Ketcham in 1986. From 1997 until May 31, 2004, General Mills sponsored and barter syndicated the first 82 episodes of the original Sailor Moon English dub (the remaining 17 of 82 episodes premiered on Cartoon Network's programming block Toonami in 1998).

=== Diversification: toys and restaurants ===
The first venture General Mills took into the toy industry was in 1965. The company bought Rainbow Crafts, which was the manufacturer of Play-Doh. General Mills's purchase of the company was significant because it brought production costs down and tripled the revenue.

In the 1960s, General Mills bought Jesse Jones, a sausage and meat products maker started in Virginia and moved to Garner, North Carolina on 1947, and added it to a division that made Slim Jim and Penrose. Jesse Jones was sold to White Packing in 1997.

In 1967, General Mills bought the Kenner toy company. Later, they acquired Parker Brothers in the following year.

General Mills came out with their "monster cereals" in the 1970s. The cereals are now produced and sold seasonally around Halloween.

In 1970, General Mills acquired Red Lobster, then a five-unit restaurant, and expanded it nationwide. Soon, a division of General Mills titled General Mills Restaurants developed to take charge of the Red Lobster chain. In 1980, General Mills acquired the California-based Good Earth health food restaurant chain. The company eventually converted the restaurants into other chain restaurants they were operating, such as Red Lobster. In 1982, General Mills Restaurants founded a new Italian-themed restaurant chain called Olive Garden. Another themed restaurant, China Coast, was added before the entire group was spun off to General Mills shareholders in 1995 as Darden Restaurants.

During the same decade, General Mills ventured further, starting the General Mills Specialty Retail Group. They acquired two clothing and apparel companies, Talbots and Eddie Bauer. The acquisition was short-lived. Talbots was purchased by a Japanese company, then known as JUSCO, and the Spiegel company purchased Bauer. Spiegel later declared bankruptcy, yet Bauer still remains, albeit in a smaller presence in the United States today.

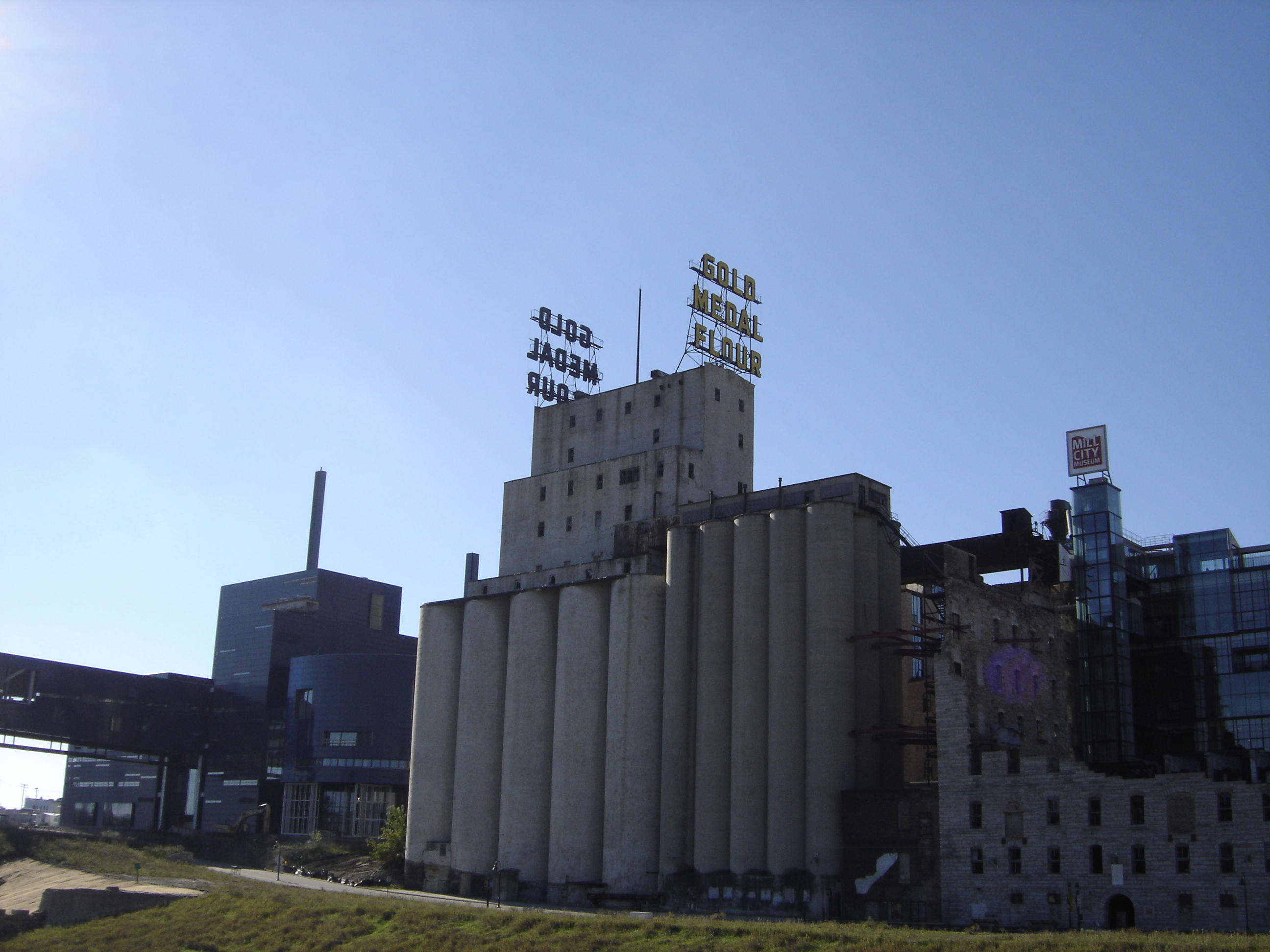
The Washburn "A" Mill, the producer of Gold Medal Flour, now the Minnesota Historical Society Mill City Museum

From 1976 to 1985, General Mills went to court as the parent company of Parker Brothers, which held the rights on the brand name and gaming idea of the board game Monopoly, claiming that the so-called Anti-Monopoly game of an economics professor infringed their trademark. The dispute extended up to the United States Supreme Court, which ruled against them, saying that while they have exclusive rights to the game Monopoly, they cannot prevent others from using the word "monopoly" in the name of a game.

In 1985, General Mills's toy division was separated from its parent as Kenner Parker Toys, Inc. There were many potential acquirers of the business but it was floated on the stock exchange with General Mills's shareholders getting equivalent shares in Kenner Parker. This was more tax efficient for General Mills.

=== Recent history ===
In 1990, a joint venture with Nestlé S.A. called Cereal Partners was formed which markets cereals (including many existing General Mills cereal brands) outside the US and Canada under the Nestlé name.

In 1996, General Mills acquired Ralcorp's cereal brands, including Chex and Cookie Crisp.

In 2001, the company purchased Pillsbury (sans Burger King) from Diageo, although it was officially described as a "merger".

Since 2004, General Mills has been producing more products targeted to the growing ranks of health-conscious consumers. The company has chosen to switch its entire breakfast cereal line to whole grain. The company also started manufacturing their child-targeted cereals with less sugar. General Mills has reduced the level of sugar in all cereals advertised to children to 11 grams per serving.

In April 2011, General Mills announced that it will switch all 1 million eggs it uses each year to cage-free.

General Mills was ranked #181 on the 2012 Fortune 500 list of America's largest corporations, 161 in 2015 and was the third-largest food consumer products company in the United States. During June 2012, the company's vice-president for diversity stated that General Mills opposes a Minnesota amendment banning gay marriage, stating that the company values "inclusion". The company received positive feedback for its stand which might attract people to its global workforce.

The company acquired organic food producer Annie's for a fee of around $820 million, as part of its strategy to expand in the US natural foods market. In October 2014, General Mills announced plans to cut 700 to 800 jobs, mostly in the US, in corporate restructuring planned to be completed by the end of 2015.

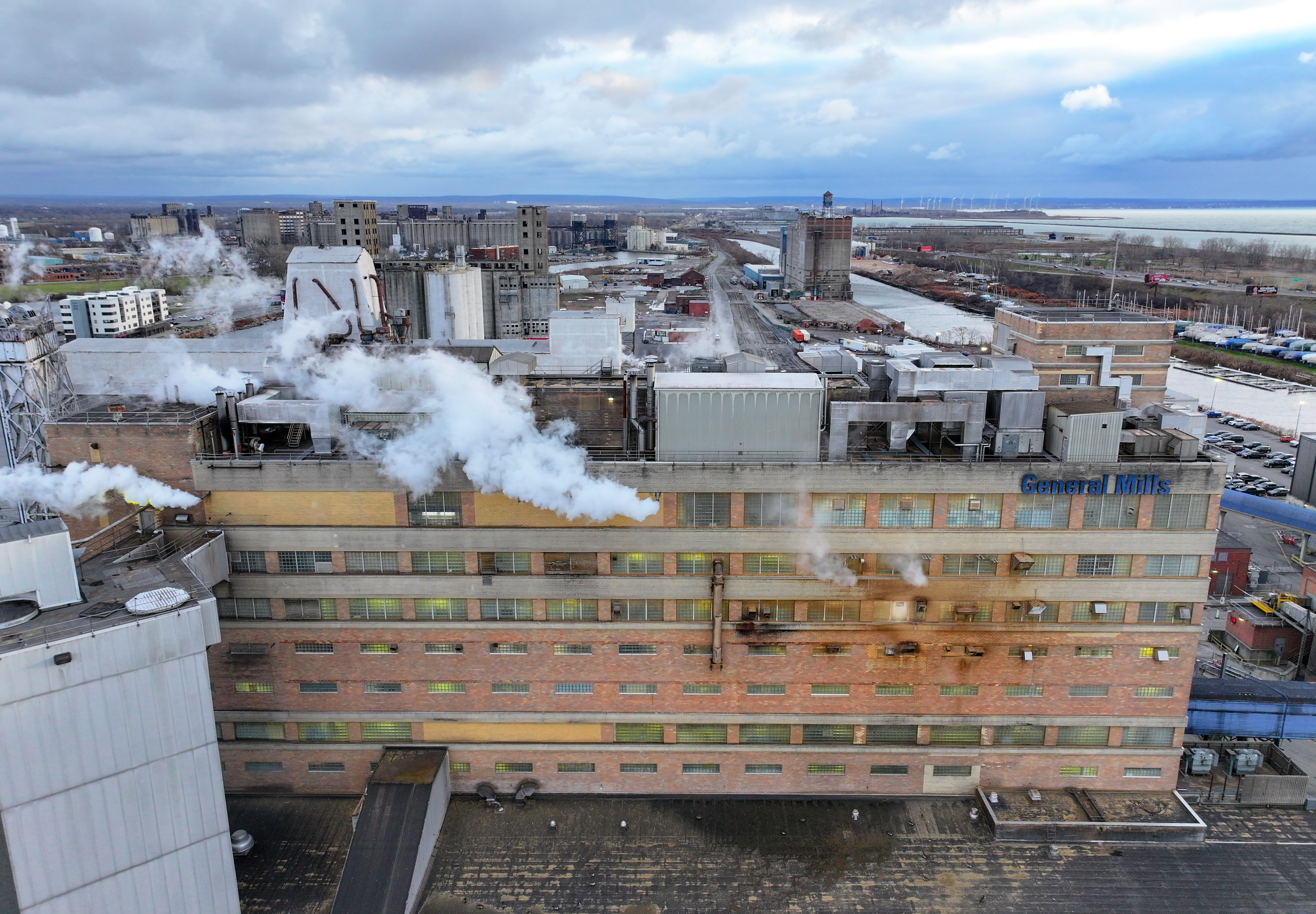
General Mills cereal plant in Buffalo, NY

In 2015, citing climate change, General Mills promised to reduce its greenhouse gas emissions by 28 percent over 10 years. In December 2016, the company announced it would be restructuring, splitting into four business groups based on global region, and cutting as many as 600 jobs.

In February 2018, the company entered into the pet products industry, paying $8 billion to buy Blue Buffalo Pet Products, Inc. As of 2018, the company ranked 182nd on the Fortune 500 list of the largest United States corporations by revenue.

Having launched its first regenerative agriculture pilot program in March 2019, the company has plans to improve soil health on 1 million acres of farmland by 2030 and has formed a partnership with Regrow Agriculture, a software and data analysis company that uses satellite imagery, weather data, and soil data to measure carbon sequestration in soil.

In February 2020, General Mills was recognized by CDP as a global leader in corporate sustainability and received a place on the CDP "A List" for both climate change and water security.

On May 15, 2021, General Mills announced that it was acquiring Tyson Foods's pet treat business, including True Chews, Nudges and Top Chews, for $1.2 billion. The acquisition was completed on July 7, 2021.

In April 2022, there were increasing news reports and complaints that the company's Lucky Charms cereal was somehow making individuals ill, with the most common complaints being gastrointestinal in nature, such as nausea, vomiting, and diarrhea. The episodes have not yet resulted in a company- or FDA-initiated recall; an FDA spokesperson said they were investigating approximately 100 reports. These reports came as norovirus was circulating in some areas of the US. It is relatively rare for cereals, as opposed to other foods, to be contaminated by microbes, because they must be baked, although it is possible if conditions are unsanitary.

On May 12, 2022, General Mills announced that it was acquiring TNT Crust, a supplier of frozen pizza crusts, from Peak Rock Capital.

On May 25, 2022, General Mills announced that it was selling its Hamburger Helper and Suddenly Salad businesses to Eagle Family Foods Group for $610 million. The sale was completed on July 5, 2022.

On November 9, 2023, General Mills acquired a pet supplement business, Fera Pets, Inc.

On September 12, 2024, General Mills announced that it would sell its North American yogurt division to Groupe Lactalis and Sodiaal. Lacatlis would buy the US brands while Sodiaal would buy the Canadian brands which would be completed by 2025. The sale for its Canadian yogurt division was completed on January 27, 2025, officially bringing all of Yoplait's international operations under Sodiaal. The sale of the US yogurt division to Lactalis was completed on June 30th.

On March 17, 2026, Brazilian food industry company 3 Corações announced that it will acquire the Brazilian operations of General Mills for R$800 million, pending regulatory approval, which is expected to conclude at the end of 2026.

== Brands ==
=== Breakfast cereals ===
General Mills's breakfast cereals include:

- Basic 4
- Boo-Berry
- Cascadian Farm
- Cheerios and its variants
- Chex and its variants
- Cinnamon Toast Crunch
- Cocoa Puffs
- Cookie Crisp
- Count Chocula
- Fiber One / Fibre One
- Franken-Berry
- French Toast Crunch
- Gold Flakes
- Honey Nut Clusters
- Kix
- Lucky Charms
- Morning Summit
- Oatmeal Crisp
- Raisin Nut Bran
- Reese's Puffs
- Total
- Trix
- Wheaties

Some brands are marketed outside the US and Canada by the Cereal Partners joint venture using the Nestlé brand.

==== Cereal collaborations ====
General Mills' past and current cereal collaborations include:

Cereal name	Collaboration with	Date launched
Hershey Kisses Cereal	Hershey's	January 2020
IHOP Blueberry and Syrup Mini Pancake Cereal	IHOP	December 2022
Kelce Mix Cereal	Travis and Jason Kelce	September 2024

=== Grain snacks ===
The company's grain-snack brands include:

- Bugles
- Cascadian Farms
- Chex Mix
- Gardetto's
- Nature Valley
- Fiber One / Fibre One bars

=== Baking goods ===
The company's baking-goods brands include:

- Betty Crocker
- Bisquick (now a Betty Crocker brand)
- Gold Medal Flour
- Jus-Rol
- Knack & Back
- La Salteña
- Pillsbury
- V. Pearl

It also produces fruit snacks, including Fruit by the Foot, Fruit Gushers, Fruit Roll-Ups, and Fruit Shapes.

=== Meal products ===
The company's meal products brands include:

- Betty Crocker
- Diablitos Underwood
- Old El Paso
- Wanchai Ferry

=== Organic food ===
It also produces organic foods, via Cascadian Farm, which they took over when they bought Small Planet Foods, and Muir Glen. More recently, as of 2014, it has purchased Annie's Homegrown.

=== Other brands ===
Other company brands include Annie's, Blue Buffalo, Frescarini, Latina, Tiki Pets, Totino's, Jeno's, Progresso, Colombo and Lärabar. It also produces Häagen-Dazs ice cream outside of the US and Canada. General Mills acquired the meat-based brand Epic Provisions in 2016.

=== Discontinued brands ===
General Mills brands no longer manufactured include:

- Banana Wackies / Wackies (introduced 1965; discontinued 1968)
- Baron von Redberry and Sir Grapefellow (introduced 1972, discontinued 1975)
- Benefit (which contained psyllium, an Indian-grown grain used as a laxative and cholesterol-reducer)
- Body Buddies (introduced 1979; two flavors, Brown Sugar & Honey and Natural Fruit Flavor)
- Buc Wheats
- Buñuelitos ("Sweetened corn puffs with cinnamon and a touch of honey... Traditional south of the border flavor made right here in the U.S.A.")
- Chocolate Flavor Donutz (introduced 1982; discontinued 1984)
- Circus Fun (introduced 1986; discontinued 1989)
- Clackers (introduced 1968; discontinued 1973) - graham cracker-flavored
- Clusters (introduced 1987)
- Country Corn Flakes (introduced 1961)
- Crazy Cow - A chocolate corn cereal which resembles cocoa puffs (introduced 1978, discontinued, 1980)
- Crispy Wheats 'n Raisins (introduced 1980)
- E.T. Cereal (introduced 1984, discontinued 1986)
- Fingos ("The Cereal Made to Eat with Your Fingers")
- Frosty O's (introduced 1959; discontinued 1979)
- Fruit Brute (introduced 1974; discontinued 1982)
- Fruity Yummy Mummy
- Goodness Pack, an assortment of eight single-serving boxes of different cereals, designed to compete with Kellogg's and Post Cereals assortments
- Harmony
- Hi-Pro (introduced 1958; discontinued 1964)
- Ice Cream Cones (vanilla, chocolate, chocolate chip flavors; introduced 1987, discontinued same year; briefly reintroduced in 2003)
- Jets (formerly Sugar Jets; discontinued 1974)
- Jurassic Park Crunch
- Kaboom (introduced 1969)
- Millenios from Cheerios
- Mr. Wonderfull's Surprize ("Only Cereal with a Creamy Chocolate Filling")
- Monopoly Cereal
- Neopets Islandberry Crunch (based on the Neopets online virtual pet community)
- Pac-Man Cereal
- Peanut Butter Boppers (1980s)
- Peanut Butter Toast Crunch
- Powdered Donutz (introduced 1981; discontinued 1984)
- Princess Fairytale Flakes
- Ripple Crisp
- Rocky Road
- S'Mores Grahams / S'Mores Crunch
- Sprinkle Spangles
- Star Wars Episode II (based on the 2002 film Star Wars: Episode II – Attack of the Clones)
- Strawberry Shortcake
- Sugar Jets (introduced 1954)
- Sunrise Organic
- Triples (introduced 1991)
- Twinkles (introduced 1960; discontinued 1973)
- USA Olympic Crunch (a tie-in with the 1998 Winter Olympics in Nagano, Japan)
- Wheat Hearts
- Wheat Stax (introduced 1966; discontinued 1971) ("Now there's a cereal you can stack")
- Wheaties Dunk-a-Balls

== Public and legal issues ==
=== Association with "anti-diet" movement ===
The company has been associated with social media campaigns and education of dieticians promoting the "anti-diet" movement. This activity has been connected with helping to promote some of its own foods, which are high in sugar content.

=== Change to legal terms ===
In April 2014, the company announced that it had changed its legal terms on its website to introduce an arbitration clause requiring all disputes with General Mills to be resolved in small claims court or arbitration and not as a participant in a class action. The change was made shortly after a judge's March 26, 2014, denial of a motion to dismiss a class action regarding the marketing of the company's Nature Valley brand products. Users would be deemed to accept the terms by interacting with General Mills on its website in various ways, such as downloading coupons, subscribing to newsletters, or participating in Internet forums hosted on the website.

The New York Times stated that the agreement could be interpreted to additionally construe purchasing General Mills products at a grocery store or liking the company's Facebook page as assent to the terms; General Mills disclaimed that interpretation, calling it a "mischaracterization". The change in terms resulted in a massive backlash of protests via consumer groups and social media, and General Mills reverted the terms back to the original content after only a few days.

=== Involvement in Israeli settlements ===
On February 12, 2020, the United Nations published a database of companies doing business related in the West Bank, including East Jerusalem, as well as in the occupied Golan Heights. General Mills was listed on the database on account of the activities of its subsidiary General Mills Israel in Israeli settlements in these occupied territories, which some have argued is illegal under international law.

As of the update on June 30, 2023, General Mills is no longer involved in Israeli settlements and has been removed from the United Nations database.

=== Animal welfare ===
In 2015, General Mills set a timeline for the phase-out of products using eggs from caged chickens, committing that US products would be cage-free by 2025. In 2017, the pledge was expanded to cover chickens across the company's global operations, not just the US.

=== Carbon emissions ===
In response to pressure from activist groups and shareholders, General Mills has committed to reducing emissions from its dairy operations by 40% by 2030.

== See also ==
- List of food companies
- List of Minnesota companies

Competitors

- Kellogg's
- Post Holdings
