= William G. McGowan =

American businessman (1927–1992)

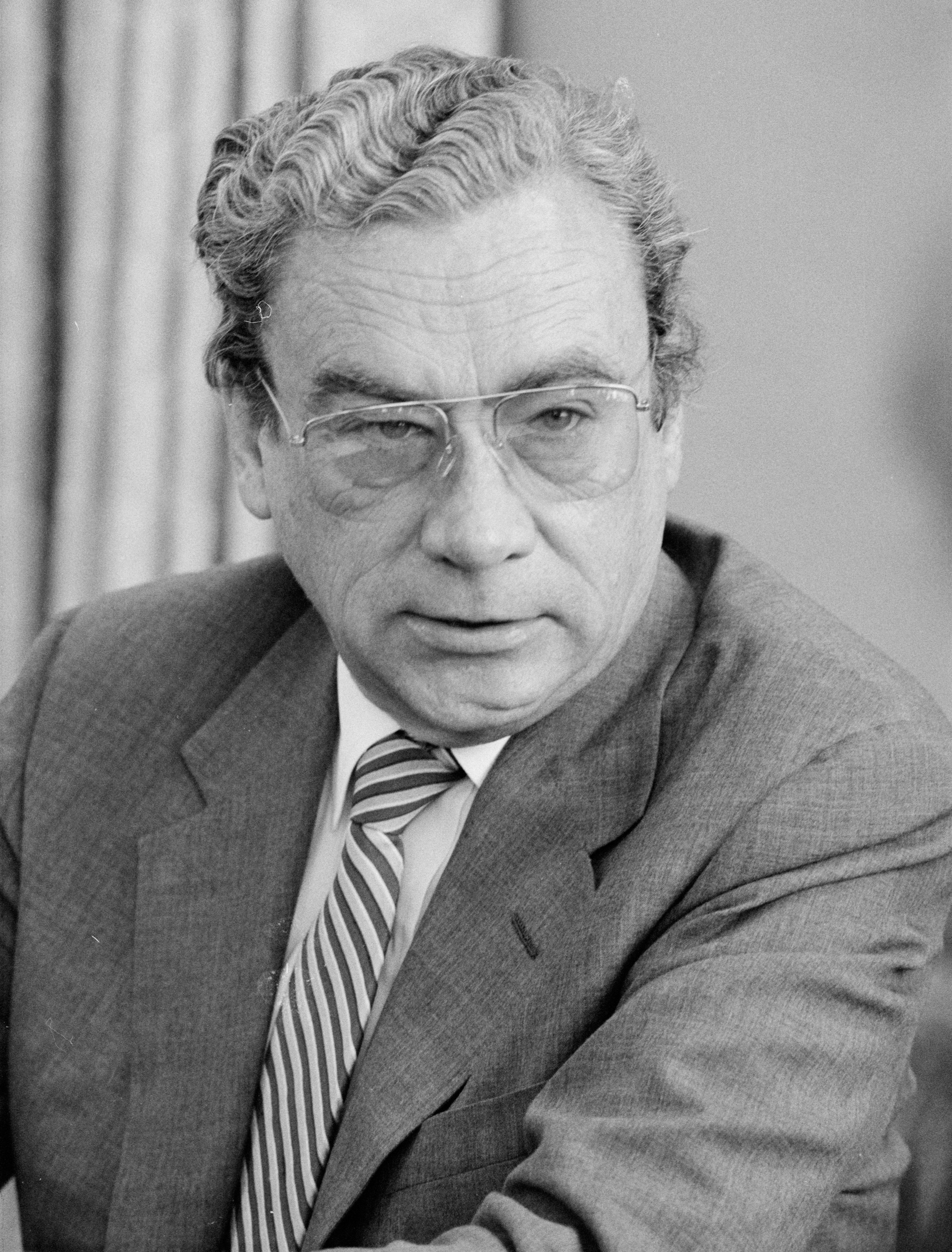
- McGowan in 1983
- Born: December 10, 1927; Ashley, Pennsylvania
- Died: June 8, 1992 (aged 64); Washington D.C.
- Occupation: Businessman
- Known for: Founder and leader of MCI Communications

William G. McGowan (December 10, 1927 – June 8, 1992) was an American entrepreneur, and founder and chairman of MCI Communications. He played an important role in the breakup of AT&T while growing MCI into a US$9.5 billion in revenue entity that controlled 16% of the American domestic and international long distance market.

== Biography ==
=== Early life ===
McGowan was born in Ashley, Pennsylvania, the third of five children. Bill was active in Ashley Boy Scouts and his troop which included his friends, Tim Klinges, Manus Cooney, Dave Cooney and George Frees, was one of the first group of Boy Scouts to go to Camp St. Andrew before it opened publicly in Tunkhannock, PA. Bill's brother, Monsignor Andrew J. McGowan eventually ran Camp St. Andrew. After graduating from Hanover High School Bill joined the US Army and served as a medic for two and a half years. (Note: The Hagley Museum's oral history-based account gives his service as three years and notes his participation in the Berlin Airlift.) After an honorable discharge from the military he attended King's College, Pennsylvania and received a degree in chemistry. He then attended Harvard Business School, graduating in 1954 as a Baker Scholar. After graduation from Harvard, McGowan began operating a consulting firm that specialized in rescuing troubled companies in the garment district of New York City. After a year of operation, his consulting agency branched out into venture capital. In the role of venture capitalist, McGowan dealt with firms developing ultrasonic cleaning technology and electro-mechanical devices.

=== Career ===
In 1968, McGowan was contacted by MCI due to his expertise in raising venture capital. Based on this contact, he made a US$50,000 investment in the fledgling business and was made chairman of Microwave Communications of America, a predecessor to MCI Communications. In his role as chairman, McGowan raised capital for the growing company and set up fifteen of the seventeen regional carriers that would form the basis of MCI's initial communications network. In 1971, he executed a reorganization of Microwave Communications of America and its seventeen subsidiaries to form MCI Communications.

In his role at MCI, McGowan established a reputation as a hard worker by routinely working fifteen-hour days. He was also a three-pack-a-day smoker and drank over twenty cups of coffee each day until his first heart attack. As leader of MCI, he labored for several years to gain the financing and regulator approvals required to begin full operations. Following the filing of MCI's 1974 lawsuit against AT&T, McGowan began cooperation with the U.S. Department of Justice which eventually led to a 1982 agreement leading to the divestiture of AT&T and the opening of the long distance telephone market within the United States.

=== Personal life ===
McGowan married Sue Ling Gin, a Chicago entrepreneur, in a private ceremony in Virginia Beach on July 5, 1984. They decided to keep their marriage secret for a year as Sue Ling wanted credit for success in her own right and not as the wife of McGowan. On April 25, 1987, McGowan underwent a heart transplant at UPMC Presbyterian in Pittsburgh, Pennsylvania.

=== Death ===
On December 21, 1986, McGowan experienced a heart attack. His medical problems resulted in his receiving a heart transplant on April 25, 1987. McGowan returned to his duties as MCI chairman after a six-month recovery, where he remained until his death on June 8, 1992, from another heart attack.

== Legacy ==
McGowan's philanthropy continues on in many forms. He established what is now the McGowan Institute for Regenerative Medicine at the University of Pittsburgh Medical Center due to his heart condition. Just before his death, he also established the William G. McGowan School of Business at King's College. Shortly after his death, the William G. McGowan Charitable Fund was founded in his name. DePaul University in Chicago has two science and research buildings named for the McGowan family including McGowan and his late brother, a Catholic priest. His charitable fund provides tuition assistance and financial aid grants for selected students. The Rochester Institute of Technology created the Center for Telecommunications and the McGowan Student Commons located in the new College Applied Science and Technology building. The National Archives in Washington, D.C., established the William G. McGowan theater in his honor.

McGowan has a fellowship foundation for second year MBA students. The foundation will pay for the second year tuition at a top business school.

In 1992, William McGowan was honored with an Edison Achievement Award for his commitment to innovation throughout his career.

In 2002, McGowan was inducted into the Wireless Hall of Fame for his dedication to the cellular industry.

== Sources ==
- "MCI Chairman Recuperating". New York Times. 8 May 1987. pp. D16.
- Lohr, Steve (9 June 1992). "William McGowan Is Dead at 64; A Challenger of Phone Monopoly". New York Times. pp. A1, D28.
- Cantelon, Philip L. (1993). The History of MCI : 1968-1988, The Early Years. Dallas: Heritage Press. LCC HE8864.M375C36 1993.
