= FlyNet =

FlyNet is an onboard communication service for Lufthansa.

== History ==
Delivered using the Connexion by Boeing (CBB) system from its first demonstration flight in 2003, until Connexion by Boeing's discontinuation in 2006, the service utilized K_{u} band radio to provide passengers with onboard Internet access, which they could connect to via Wi-Fi.

Lufthansa plans to relaunch FlyNet in the second half of 2010 in partnership with Panasonic Avionics Corporation. The new system will also use K_{u} band radio, providing satellite Internet access over Wi-Fi through Panasonic's eXConnect system, as well as text messaging and other data services for GSM/GPRS cellular devices through Panasonic's AeroMobile-based eXPhone system.

Lufthansa relaunched FlyNet in November 2010, 4 years after suspending it with a new system created by Panasonic Avionics. According to Lufthansa, the system is available on 91% of their long haul fleet, with Airbus A380 aircraft being the last to be fitted with the system. The system provides a WiFi internet connection, and GSM and GPRS services on some flights, although your carrier must have a contract with AeroMobile for you to be able to use the service. Lufthansa notes the service is unavailable in Chinese territory, and the system automatically switches off, then on, upon entering and leaving Chinese airspace respectively. Pricing for the service ranges from €9 for 1 hour, to €17 for a 24-hour pass, which can be used across multiple Lufthansa flights.

== See also ==
- Aircell
- Airfone
- Inmarsat
- LiveTV
- Gogo Inflight Internet
- OnAir
- Row 44
