= Air cell =

Air cell or aircel may refer to:

- Air cell, a prechamber in an Indirect injection internal combustion engine
- An electrochemical cell that uses air as a terminal, such as the metal-air electrochemical cell
- Using cell phones on aircraft; see mobile phones on aircraft
- Mastoid cells, also known as mastoid air cells or air cells, spaces in a bone behind the ear that contain air
- Aircell, a private company developing broadband for both private and commercial aviation
- Aircel group, an Indian mobile network operator
- Aircel Comics, a Canadian comic book publisher
