= Gogo Business Aviation =

American aviation technology business

Gogo
- Type: Division
- Industry: Technology, Aviation
- Founded: 1991; 35 years ago
- Founder: Jimmy Ray
- Headquarters: Broomfield, Colorado, United States
- Area served: Worldwide
- Key people: John Wade (EVP), Andrew E. Geist (SVP)
- Products: In-flight entertainment In-flight connectivity
- Parent: Gogo Inc.
- Website: business.gogoair.com

Gogo Business Aviation (formerly Aircell) is a division of Gogo Inflight Internet, a provider of in-flight broadband Internet service and other connectivity services for business aircraft. It is headquartered in Broomfield, CO.

Gogo Business Aviation is the only company in the United States authorized by the Federal Communications Commission (FCC) and Federal Aviation Administration (FAA) to use frequencies in the 800 MHz band for inflight communications. In June 2006, Gogo Business Aviation successfully bid $31.3 million for a 3 MHz air-to-ground spectrum in an FCC auction. The system is based on the TIA-856-A Evolution Data Optimized (EV-DO) standard.

== History ==
Aircell began in 1991 in a barbecue joint in Denison, Texas, where company founder Jimmy Ray sketched his idea for an affordable telephone system for private airplanes on a paper napkin. Through a partnership with cellular providers, Aircell began providing analog-based voice communications on private aircraft in North America.

In 1998, Aircell received an FCC waiver granting it authority to operate its analog network.

In 2002, Aircell began offering Iridium satellite for global voice and narrowband data service.

In 2005, Aircell launched Axxess, a product that provides IP-based aircraft telephone systems, with handset and color display.

On August 1, 2007, American Airlines partnered with Aircell to offer broadband on American's flights. On September 13, 2007, Virgin America partnered with Aircell to add broadband capabilities to their flights.

On January 22, 2008, American Airlines completed the first aircraft installation of the Aircell Internet broadband connection at American's Kansas City maintenance base.

On February 29, 2008, Aircell unveiled the product name as Gogo Inflight Internet.

On August 5, 2008, Delta Air Lines announced it was installing Aircell's Gogo Inflight system on all of its airplanes over the subsequent year. Delta later decided to filter pornographic content on its flights after customer and employee responses. Delta now operates Gogo on all of its mainline and two-cabin regional aircraft,

On August 20, 2008, Gogo went live on American Airlines.

On May 12, 2009, AirTran Airways announced it would install Aircell's Gogo Inflight System on all of its airplanes by late July 2009.

In June 2011, Aircell became a division of Gogo as part of a re-branding effort.

On February 24, 2010 Alaska Airlines announced it would install Aircell's Gogo Inflight system on all of its airplanes.

October 2012, Aircell is awarded Dristribution Partner status by Inmarsat for its SwiftBroadband L-Band service

On April 15, 2013 Aircell completed its acquisition of Airfone from LiveTV.

The original Airfone service was shut down on December 31, 2013.

On September 2, 2014, Aircell was officially rebranded as Gogo Business Aviation.

In December 2024, SmartSky Networks initiated an antitrust lawsuit against Gogo Business Aviation

== Products ==
Aircell holds over 20 patents relating to technology for airborne telecommunications. Under the Gogo Biz Service, Aircell sells its ATG 2000, ATG 4000, ATG 5000, SwiftBroadband Service, Aircell Aviator 200, and Aircell Aviator 300/350 products.

Formation Inc., a software company based in Moorestown, New Jersey, developed two critical hardware components of Aircell's Gogo Inflight Internet system: its central processor unit (ACPU) and the custom-built cabin wireless access point (CWAP).

== See also ==
- OnAir
- AeroMobile
- Panasonic Avionics
- Row 44
- Connexion by Boeing
- SmartSky Networks
