= In-flight entertainment =

Entertainment available to aircraft passengers during a flight

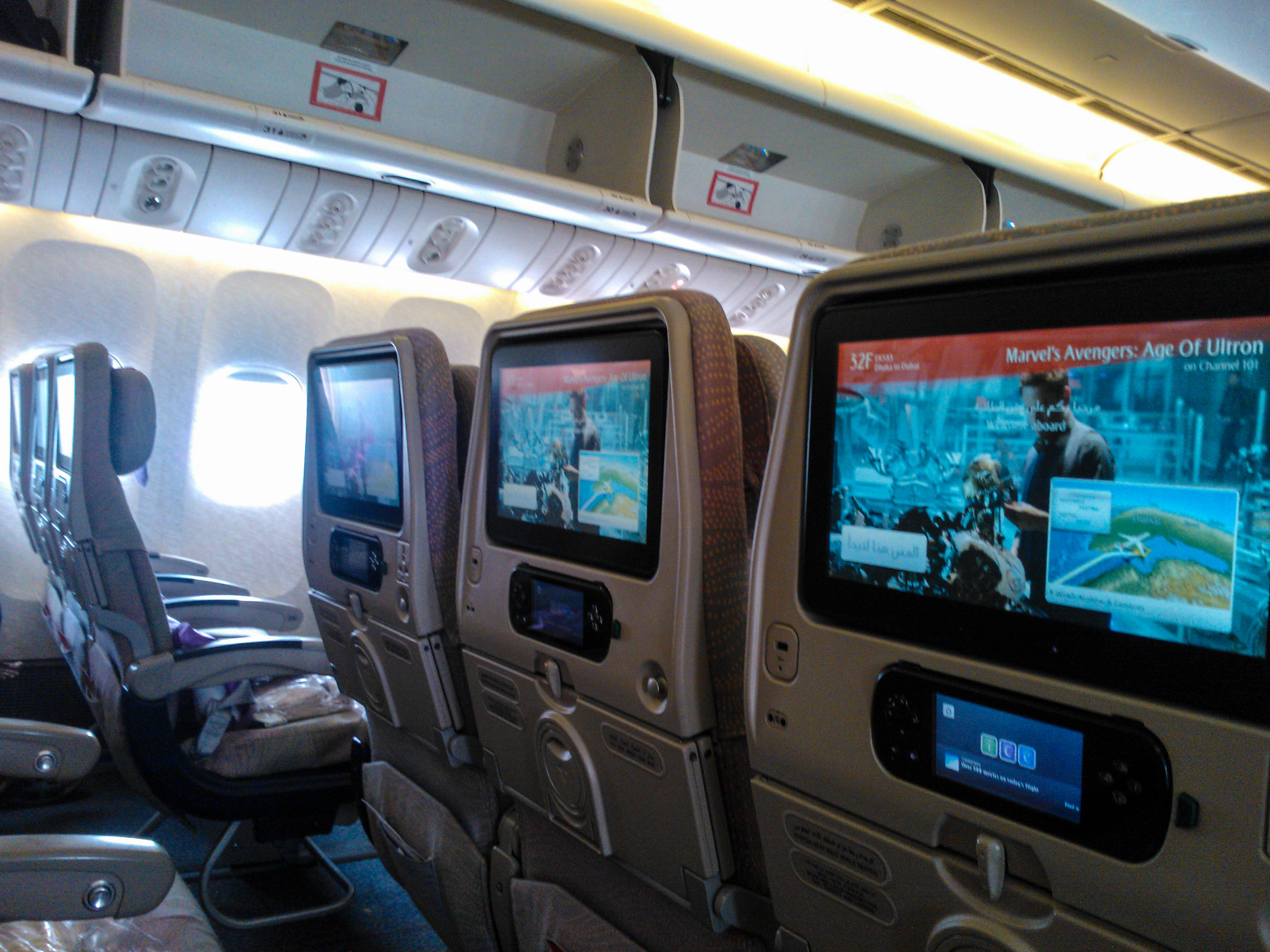
Economy class in-flight entertainment in 2015 on the airline Emirates

In-flight entertainment (IFE) is audio-visual equipment available to aircraft passengers during a flight. Frequently managed by content service providers, the types of in-flight entertainment devices and their content vary significantly based on the airline, aircraft type, and geographic region. In addition to entertainment content, these systems may offer various value-added services and informational functions, such as flight connection details, meal ordering, shopping, services options, and the presentation of safety videos, etc.

During the early years of air travel in the 1920s, in-flight entertainment took the form of movies that were initially shown on a large screen. With advancements in digital technology over the decades, personal IFE display screens became prevalent during the 1990s, when demand for better IFE became a major factor in the design of aircraft cabins. The advent of small entertainment and communication devices also allows passengers to use their own portable devices, subject to regulations to prevent them interfering with aircraft equipment, an increasing number of economy cabins, particularly on budget airlines, have upgraded to In-flight Entertainment and Connectivity (IFEC) system. High-speed internet is gradually becoming available on aircraft, providing passengers with a more complete in-flight experience.

Design issues for IFE include system safety, cost efficiency, software reliability, hardware maintenance, and user compatibility.

== History ==
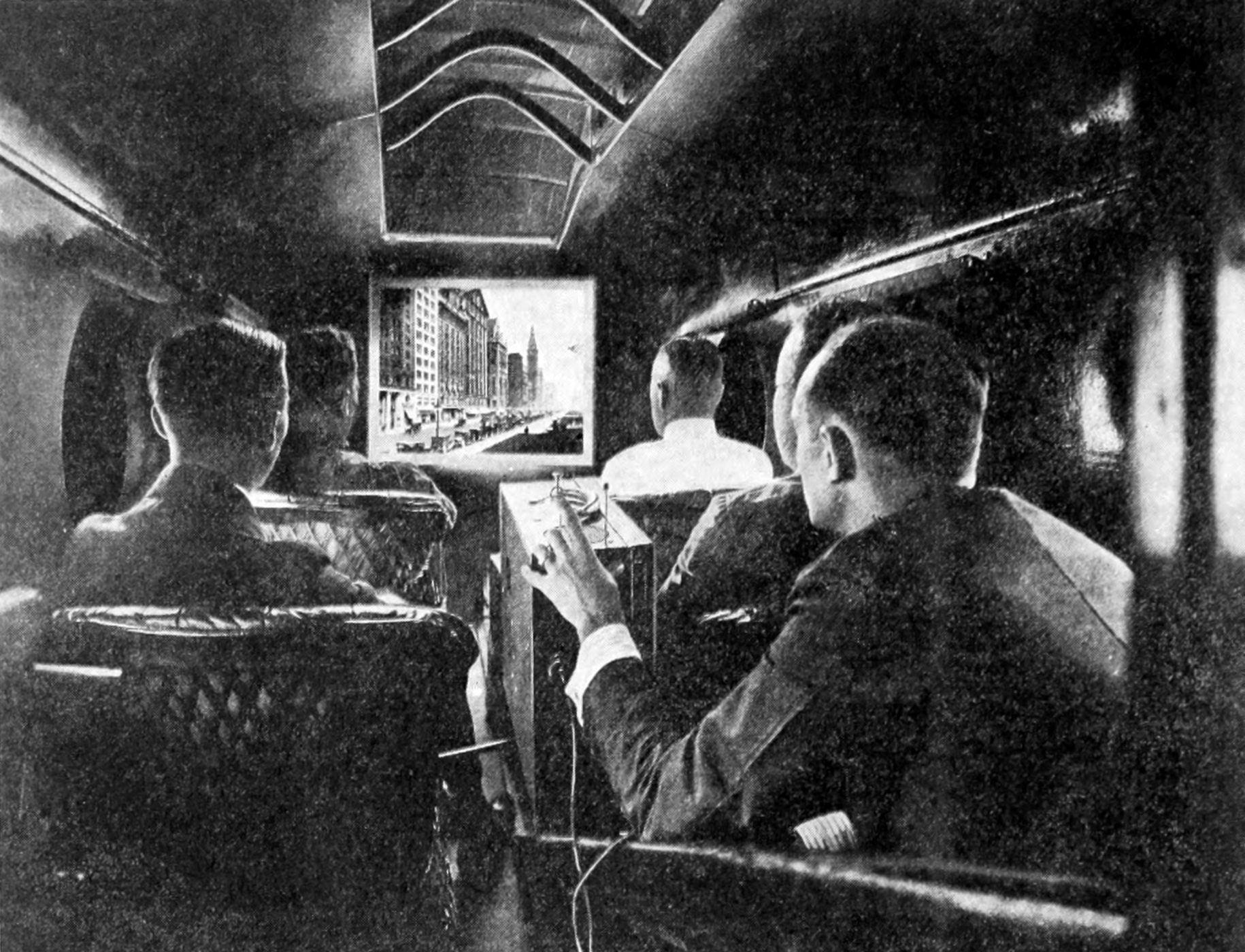
The first in-flight film screened during the 1921 Pageant of Progress Exposition in Chicago

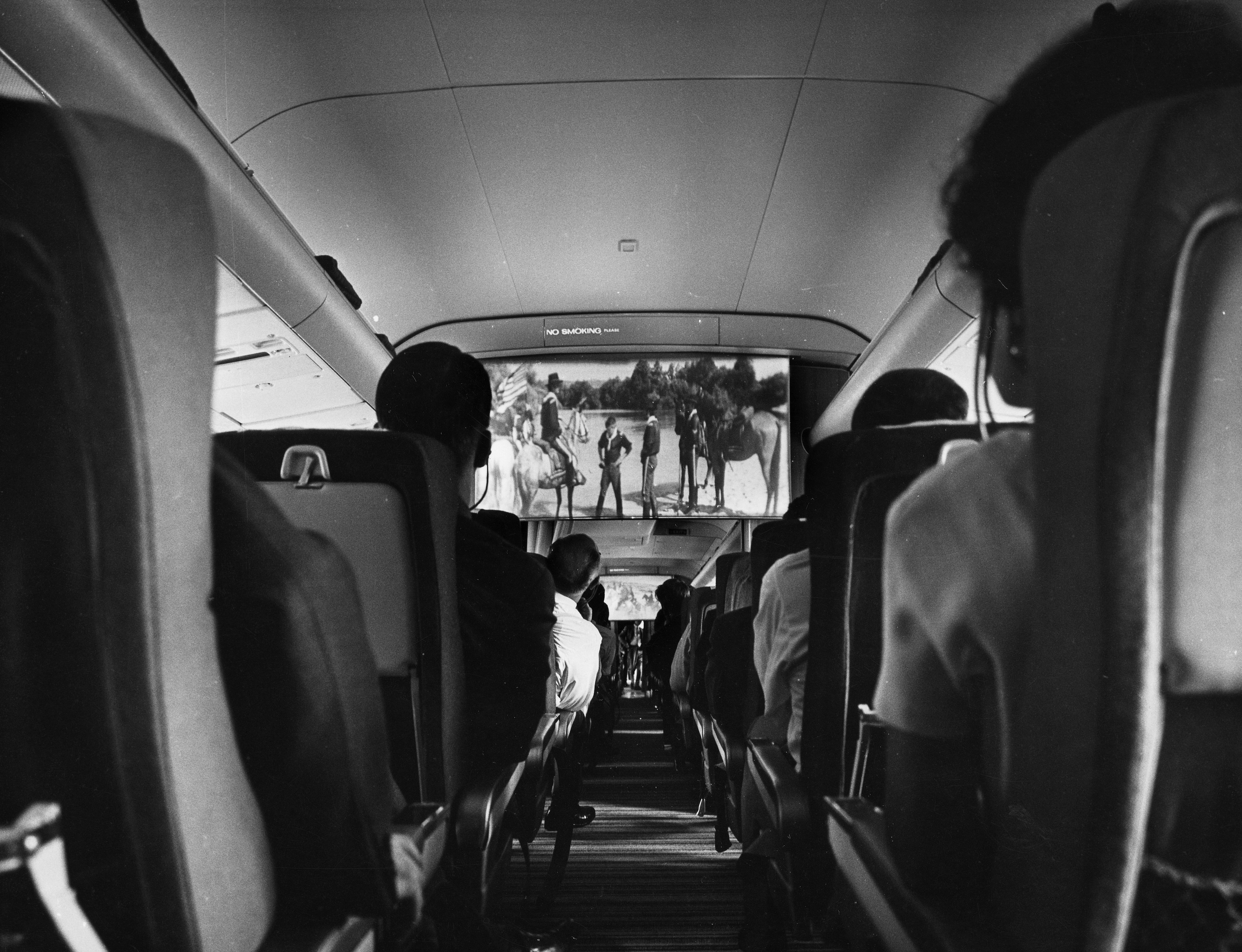
Movie screening in a DC-8 of SAS, 1968

The first in-flight movie was screened by Aeromarine Airways in 1921, showing the film Howdy Chicago (1921) to passengers on a Felixstowe F.5 flying boat as it flew around Chicago. The film The Lost World was shown to passengers of an Imperial Airways flight in April 1925 between London (Croydon Airport) and Paris. Eleven years later, in 1932, the first in-flight television called 'media event' was shown on a Western Air Express Fokker F.10 aircraft. In 1936, the airship Hindenburg offered passengers a piano, lounge, dining room, smoking room, and bar during the 2 1/2-day flight between Europe and America.

The post-WWII British Bristol Brabazon airliner was initially specified with a 37-seat cinema within its huge fuselage; this was later reduced to a 23-seat cinema sharing the rear of the aircraft with a lounge and cocktail bar. The aircraft never entered service.

However, it was not until the 1960s that in-flight entertainment became mainstream and popular. In 1961, David Flexer of Inflight Motion Pictures developed the 16mm film system using a 25-inch reel for a wide variety of commercial aircraft. Capable of holding the entire film, and mounted horizontally to maximize space, this replaced the previous 30-inch-diameter film reels. In 1961, TWA committed to Flexer's technology and was the first to debut a feature film in flight. Interviewed by The New Yorker in 1962, Flexer said, "an awful lot of ingenuity has gone into this thing, which started from my simply thinking one day, in flight, that air travel is both the most advanced form of transportation and the most boring." Pakistan International Airlines was the first international airline to introduce this entertainment system, showing regularly scheduled films from 1962.

In 1963, Avid Airline Products developed and manufactured the first pneumatic headset used on board the airlines and provided these early headsets to TWA. These early systems consisted of in-seat audio that could be heard with hollow tube headphones. In 1979, pneumatic headsets were replaced by electronic headsets, which were initially available only on selected flights and premium cabins. Pneumatic headphones continued to be offered on Delta Air Lines flights until 2003, despite the fact that electronic headphone jacks have existed on Delta planes since the adoption of Boeing 767-200 in 1982.

Throughout the early to mid-1960s, some in-flight movies were played back from videotape, using early compact transistorized videotape recorders made by Sony and Ampex, and played back on CRT monitors mounted on the upper sides in the cabin above the passenger seats with several monitors placed a few seats apart from each other. The audio was played back through the headsets.

In 1971, TRANSCOM developed the 8mm film cassette. Flight attendants could now change movies in-flight and add short subject programming.

In the late 1970s and early 1980s, CRT-based projectors began to appear on newer widebody aircraft, such as the Boeing 767. These used LaserDiscs or video cassettes for playback. Some airlines upgraded the old film IFE systems to the CRT-based systems in the late 1980s and early 1990s on some of their older widebodies. In 1985, Avicom introduced the first personal audio player system, based on the Philips Tape Cassette technology. In 1988, the Airvision company introduced the first in-seat audio/video on-demand systems using 2.7 inches (69 mm) LCD technology for Northwest Airlines. The trials, which were run by Northwest Airlines on its Boeing 747 fleet, received overwhelmingly positive passenger reaction. As a result, this completely replaced the CRT technology.

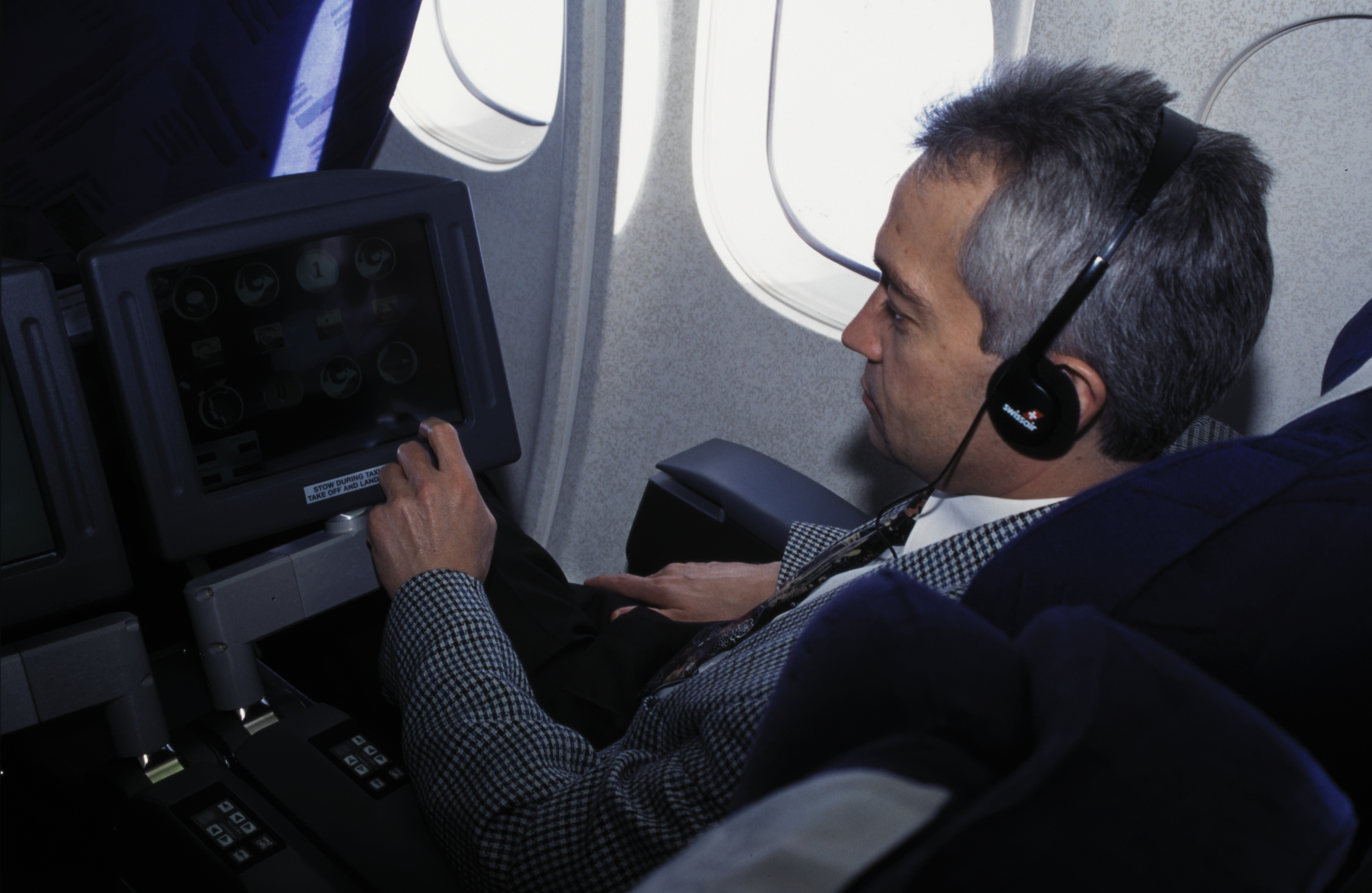
Passenger gambling on the in-flight entertainment system aboard the McDonnell Douglas MD-11 of Swissair airline in 1997

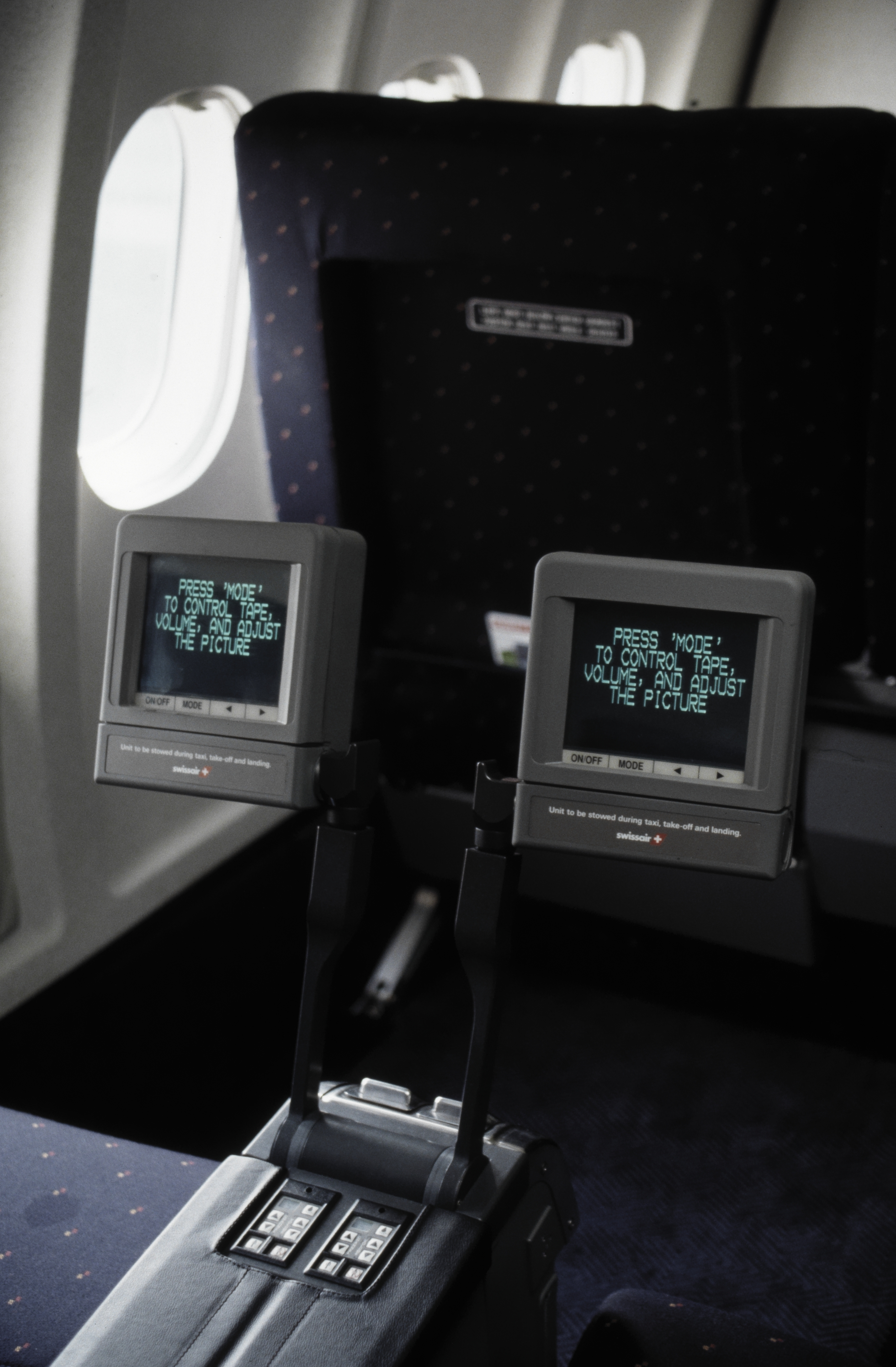
Video system on Swissair MD-11

In 1996 and 1997, Swissair and Alitalia introduced the first digital in-flight entertainment systems aboard its aircraft manufactured by US-based company Interactive Flight Technologies, marking a notable development in passenger amenities, that would generate additional revenue for the airline. These systems featured individual touchscreen displays integrated into seat armrests, allowing passengers to access various entertainment including pay-per-view movie library, music, games, and flight details such as a moving map, speed, and altitude. Also, the IFT systems on Swissair offered first ever inflight gambling activities with winnings that could go as high as $3,500.

Today, in-flight entertainment is available on almost all wide body aircraft, and often excluded from narrow body aircraft, largely due to aircraft storage and weight limits. The Boeing 757 was the first narrow body aircraft to widely feature both audio and video in-flight entertainment. Most Boeing 757s feature ceiling-mounted CRT screens, although some newer 757s may feature drop-down LCDs or audio-video on demand systems in the back of each seat. Many Airbus A320 series and Boeing 737 Next Generation aircraft are also equipped with drop-down LCD screens. Some airlines, such as WestJet, United Airlines, and Delta Air Lines, have equipped some narrow body aircraft with personal video screens at every seat. Others, such as Air Canada and JetBlue, have even equipped some regional jets with VOD.

For the introduction of personal TVs on board jetBlue, company management tracked that lavatory queuing went far down. They originally had two planes, one with functioning IFE and one with none; the functioning one was later called "the happy plane".

== System safety and regulation ==
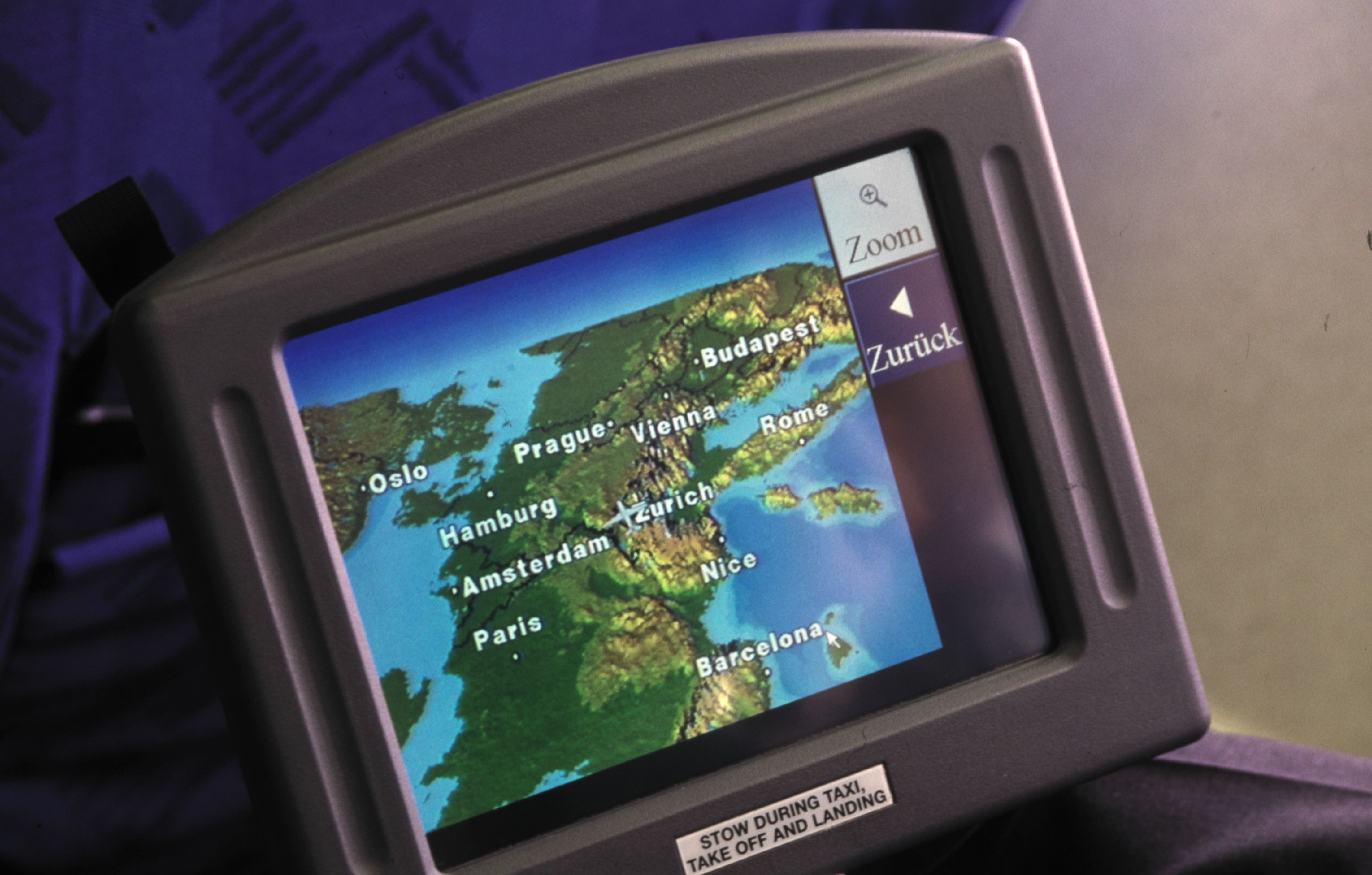
In-flight entertainment equipment touchscreen aboard Swissair MD-11 in 1997

One major obstacle in creating an in-flight entertainment system is system safety. With the sometimes miles of wiring involved, voltage leaks, arcing and heat become a problem. This is more than a theoretical concern; the IFE system was implicated in the crash of Swissair Flight 111 in 1998. To contain any possible issues, the in-flight entertainment system is typically isolated from the main systems of the aircraft. In the United States, for an aviation product to be considered safe and reliable, it must be certified by the FAA and pass all of the applicable requirements found in the Federal Aviation Regulations. The concerning section, or title, dealing with the aviation industry and the electronic systems embedded in the aircraft, is CFR title 14 part 25. Contained inside Part 25 are rules relating to the aircraft's electronic system.

There are two major sections of the FAA's airworthiness regulations that regulate flight entertainment systems and their safety in transport category aircraft: 14 CFR 25.1301 which approves the electronic equipment for installation and use, by assuring that the system in question is properly labeled, and that its design is appropriate to its intended function. 14 CFR 25.1309 states that the electrical equipment must not alter the safety or functionality of the aircraft upon the result of a failure. One way for the intended IFE system to meet this regulatory requirement is for it to be independent from the aircraft's main power source and processor. By separating the power supplies and data links from that of the aircraft's performance processor, in the event of a failure the system is self-contained, and can not alter the functionality of the aircraft. Upon a showing of compliance to all of the applicable U.S. regulations the in-flight entertainment system is capable of being approved in the United States. Certain U.S. design approvals for IFE may be directly accepted in other countries, or may be capable of being validated, under existing bilateral airworthiness safety agreements.

== Cost efficiency ==
The companies involved are in a constant battle to cut costs of production, without cutting the system's quality and compatibility. Cutting production costs may be achieved by anything from altering the housing for personal televisions, to reducing the amount of embedded software in the in-flight entertainment processor. Difficulties with cost are also present with the customers, or airlines, looking to purchase in-flight entertainment systems. Most in-flight entertainment systems are purchased by existing airlines as an upgrade package to an existing fleet of aircraft. This cost can be anywhere from $2 million to $5 million for a plane to be equipped with a set of seat back LCD monitors and an embedded IFE system.

Some of the IFE systems are being purchased already installed in a new aircraft, such as the modern Airbus A320, which eliminates the possibility of having upgrade difficulties. Some airlines are passing the cost directly into the customers ticket price, while some are charging a user fee based on an individual customers use. Some are also attempting to get a majority of the cost paid for by advertisements on, around, and in their IFE.

The largest international airlines sometimes pay more than $90,000 for a license to show one movie over a period of two or three months. These airlines usually feature up to 100 movies at once, whereas 20 years ago they would have only 10 or 12. In the United States, airlines pay a flat fee every time the movie is watched by a passenger. Some airlines spend up to $20 million per year on content.

== Varieties ==
=== Moving-map systems ===
A moving-map system is a real-time flight information and position display. These systems were the first type of computerized in flight entertainment. In addition to displaying a map that illustrates the position and direction of the plane, most systems give (utilizing both the imperial and metric systems) the altitude, airspeed, outside air temperature, distance to the destination, distance from the origination point, and origin/destination/local time (using both the 12-hour and 24-hour clocks). The moving-map system information is derived in real time from the aircraft's flight management system.

==== History ====
Simplified version of Airshow

The first moving-map system designed for passengers was named Airshow and introduced in 1982. It was invented by Airshow Inc (ASINC), a small southern California corporation, which later became part of Rockwell Collins. The system worked by generating a video of the map and distributing it to overhead projectors in the cabin. The maps for the system were developed by hand tracing hundreds of paper maps with a light pen and a SPARCstation tablet. KLM and Swissair were the first airlines to offer the moving map systems to their passengers.

The next development in moving map technology was interaction and 3D. In 2004, Rockwell Collins (who previously acquired Airshow) released the Airshow 4200i, allowing users to move and interact with the map. The system differed from previous systems by running on the seatback monitors and pulling data, rather than running on a central computer that pushes or distributes video to all of the monitors. Along with the Airshow 4200i, the Airshow 4200 was also released, notable for its 3D moving map system. It functioned in the aforementioned distributed video model.

After the attempted Christmas Day bombing of 2009, the United States Transportation Security Administration (TSA) briefly ordered the live-map shut-off on international flights landing in the United States. Some airlines complained that doing so may compel the entire IFE system to remain shut. After complaints from airlines and passengers alike, these restrictions were eased.

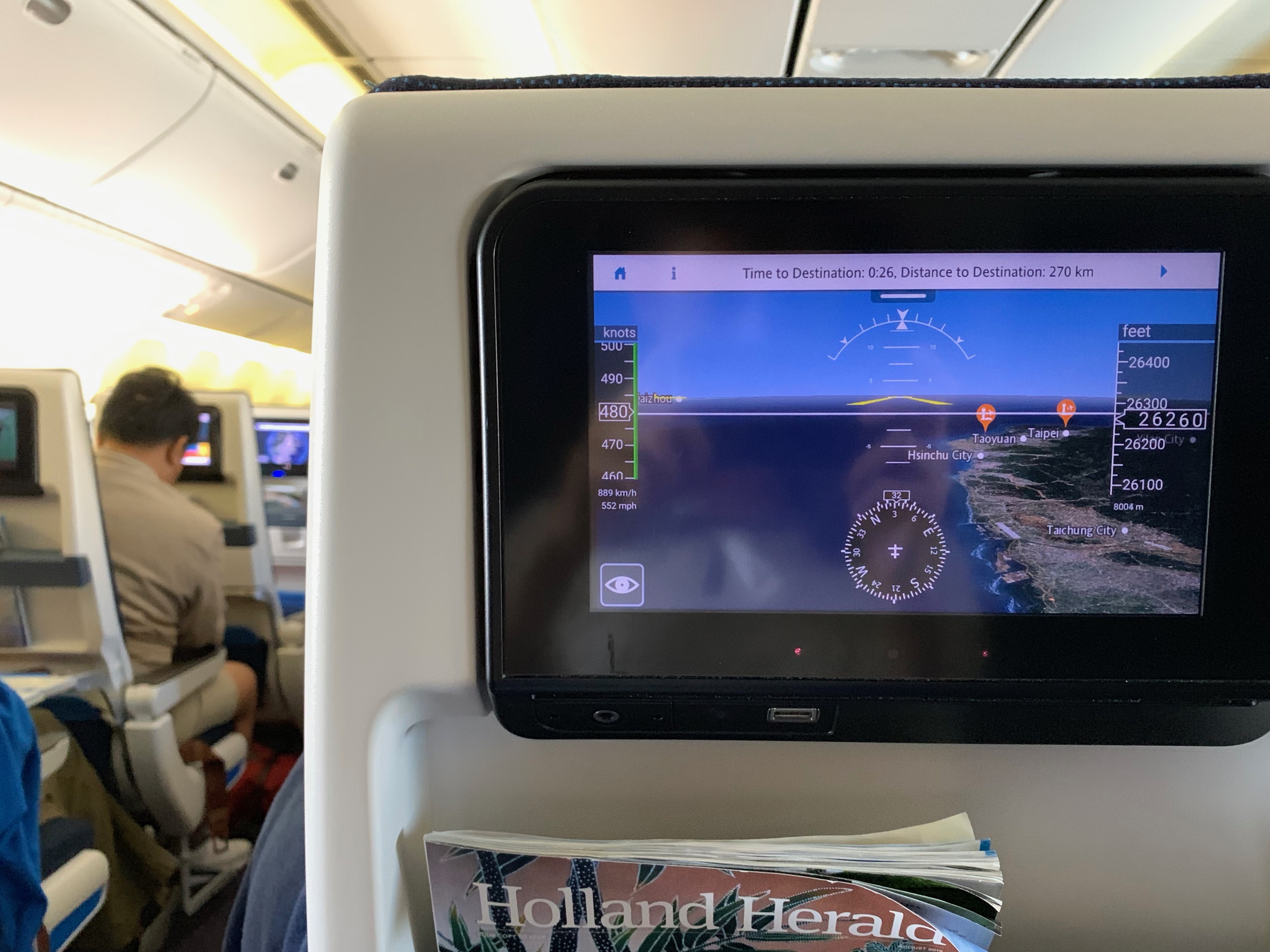
FlightPath3D displaying on a PTV screen

As computing technology advanced, interactive systems and 3D systems were combined. In 2009, Rockwell Collins started development of Airshow 3D, which released a few years later. During the 2010s as new vendors came into the market, Rockwell Collins started to lose its majority market share. In 2013, Betria Interactive unveiled FlightPath3D, a fully interactive moving-map that enables passengers to zoom and pan around a 3D world map using touch gestures, similar to Google Earth. FlightPath3D was chosen by Norwegian as the moving-map on their new fleet of Boeing 787 Dreamliners, running on Panasonic's Android based touch-screen IFE system. In 2019, Arc by Panasonic Avionics was released, developed with one of the original Airshow project managers. Other modern systems include GeoFusion 3D, adopted by Thales and Airshow ASXi by Rockwell Collins.

=== Audio entertainment ===
Audio entertainment covers music, as well as news, information, and comedy. Most music channels are pre-recorded and feature their own DJs to provide chatter, song introductions, and interviews with artists. In addition, there is sometimes a channel devoted to the plane's radio communications, allowing passengers to listen in on the pilot's in-flight conversations with other planes and ground stations.

In audio-video on demand (AVOD) systems, software such as MusicMatch is used to select music off the music server. Phillips Music Server is one of the most widely used servers running under Windows Media Center used to control AVOD systems.

This form of in-flight entertainment is experienced through headphones that are distributed to the passengers. The headphone plugs are usually only compatible with the audio socket on the passenger's armrest (and vice versa), and some airlines may charge a small fee to obtain a pair. The headphones provided can also be used for the viewing of personal televisions. Passengers can also connect their own headphones if they have compatible connectors; noise-cancelling headphones, which much reduce engine and ambient noise, are popular.

In-flight entertainment systems have been made compatible with XM Satellite Radio and with iPods, allowing passengers to access their accounts or bring their own music, along with offering libraries of full audio CDs of different genres.

=== Video entertainment ===
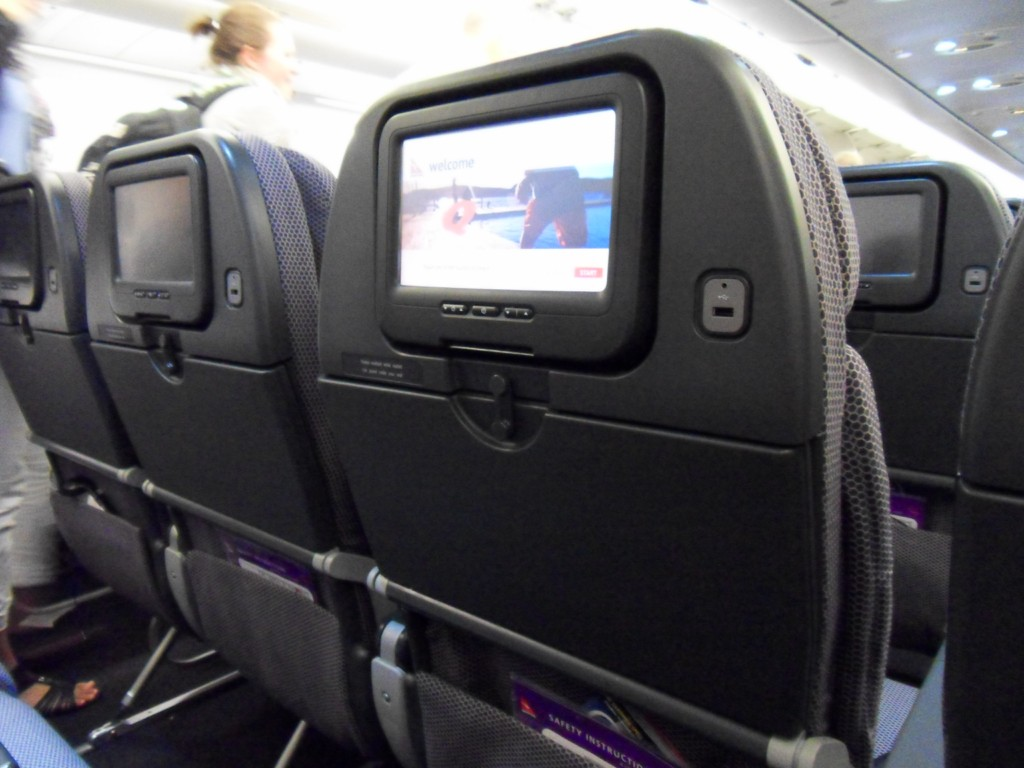
iQ entertainment system on a Qantas A330

Video entertainment is provided via a large video screen at the front of a cabin section, as well as smaller monitors situated every few rows above the aisles. Sound is supplied via the same headphones as those distributed for audio entertainment.

However, personal televisions (PTVs) for every passenger provide passengers with channels broadcasting new and classic films, as well as comedies, news, sports programming, documentaries, children's shows, and drama series. Some airlines also present news and current affairs programming, which are often pre-recorded and delivered in the early morning before flights commence. On some US domestic airlines, live TV is offered, which includes many national news channels.

PTVs are operated via an in-flight management system which stores pre-recorded channels on a central server and streams them to PTV equipped seats during flight. AVOD systems store individual programs separately, allowing a passenger to have a specific program streamed to them privately, and be able to control the playback.

Some airlines also provide video games as part of the video entertainment system. For example, Singapore Airlines passengers on some flights have access to a number of Super Nintendo games as part of its KrisWorld entertainment system. Also Virgin America's and Virgin Australia's Entertainment System offer passengers internet gaming over a Linux-based operating system.

==== Personal televisions ====
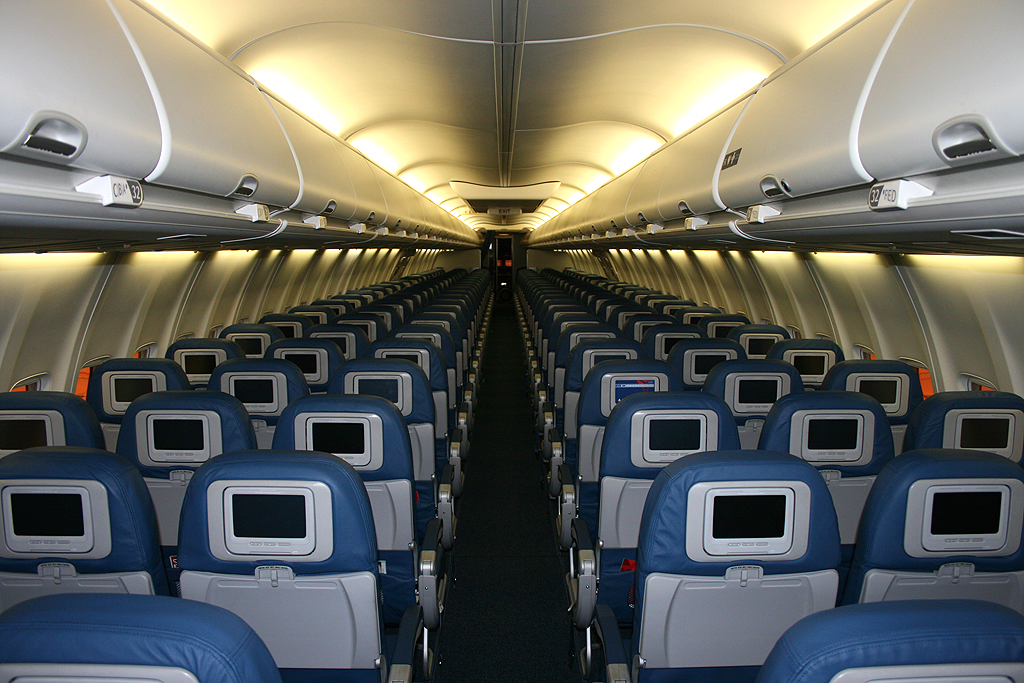
Panasonic eFX system installed on a Delta Air Lines Boeing 737-800

Most airlines have now installed personal televisions (otherwise known as PTVs) for every passenger on most long-haul routes. These televisions are usually located in the seat-backs or tucked away in the armrests for front row seats and first class. Some show direct broadcast satellite television which enables passengers to view live TV broadcasts. Some airlines also offer video games using PTV equipment. Many are now providing closed captioning for deaf and hard-of-hearing passengers.

Audio-video on demand (AVOD) entertainment has also been introduced. This enables passengers to pause, rewind, fast-forward, or stop a program that they have been watching. This is in contrast to older entertainment systems where no interactivity is provided for. AVOD also allows the passengers to choose among movies stored in the aircraft computer system.

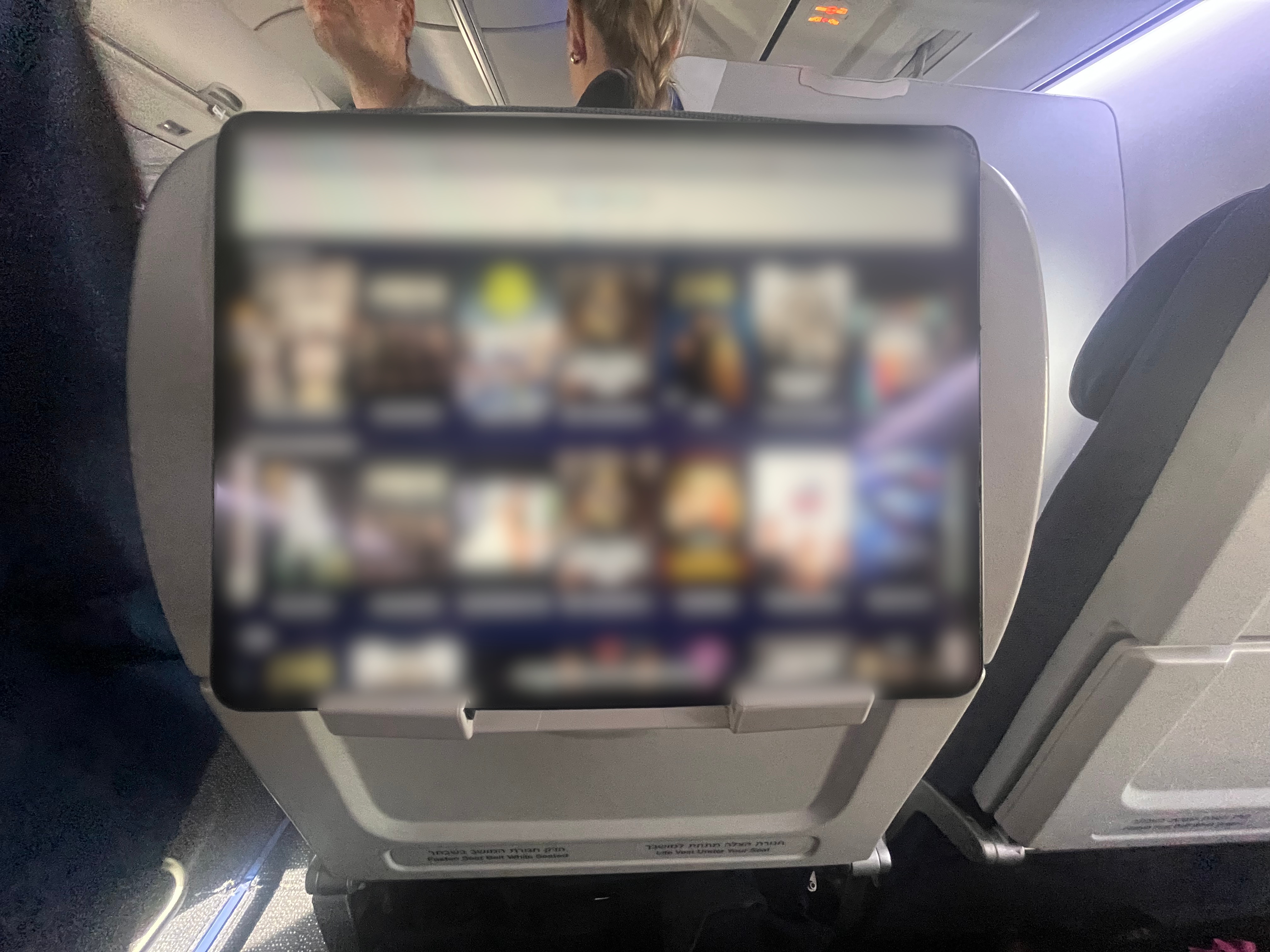
A BYOD entertainment system on an El Al Boeing 737-800, running on an iPad through its web browser

In addition to the personal televisions that are installed in the seatbacks, portable media player (PMP) systems were introduced in the 2000s and early 2010s. These PMPs can be handed out and collected by the cabin crew, or can be "semi-embedded" into the seatback or seat arm. In both of these scenarios, the PMP can pop in and out of an enclosure built into the seat, or an arm enclosure. Later, bring-your-own-device (BYOD) systems were introduced in the late 2010s and 2020s; these systems allow the passenger's own smartphone or tablet computer to serve as the IFE screen, by connecting it to the plane's media server over Wi-fi via a plane-wide internal network. The BYOD system's internal network also serves as an internet connection on planes which have the necessary equipment.

An advantage of PMP and BYOD systems is that, unlike seatback PTVs, equipment boxes for the inflight entertainment system do not need to be installed under the seats, since those boxes increase the weight of the aircraft and impede legroom; however, this advancement has been neutralized by more modern seatback systems, which host their equipment in the same enclosure as the screen similarly to tablet computers.

==== In-flight movies ====
Personal on-demand videos are stored in an aircraft's main in-flight entertainment system, whence they can be viewed on demand by a passenger over the aircraft's built in media server and wireless broadcast system. Along with the on-demand concept comes the ability for the user to pause, rewind, fast forward, or jump to any point in the movie. There are also movies that are shown throughout the aircraft at one time, often on shared overhead screens or a screen in the front of the cabin. More modern aircraft are now allowing personal electronic devices (PEDs) to be used to connect to the on board in-flight entertainment systems.

Regularly scheduled in flight movies began to premiere in 1961 on flights from New York to Los Angeles. The first movie shown was By Love Possessed (1961), starring Lana Turner; it was first shown on July 19, 1961, when TWA showed it to its first-class passengers.

==== Closed captioning ====
Closed captioning technology for deaf and hard-of-hearing passengers started in 2008 with the airline Emirates. The captions are text streamed along with video and spoken audio and enables passengers to either enable or disable the subtitle/caption language. Closed captioning is capable of streaming various text languages, including Arabic, Chinese, English, French, German, Hindi, Spanish, and Russian. The technology is currently based on Scenarist file multiplexing so far; however, portable media players tend to use alternative technologies. A WAEA technical committee is trying to standardize the closed caption specification. In 2009, the US Department of Transportation ruled a compulsory use of captions of all videos, DVDs, and other audio-visual displays played for safety and/or informational purposes in aircraft should be high-contrast captioned (e.g., white letters on a consistent black background). As of 2013, several airlines, including United Airlines, Qantas, Southwest, and Emirates, have closed-captioning provided on their AVOD systems.

=== In-flight games ===
Video games are another emerging facet of in-flight entertainment. Some game systems are networked to allow interactive playing by multiple passengers. Later generations of IFE games began to shift focus from pure entertainment to learning. The best examples of this changing trend are the popular trivia game series and the Berlitz Word Traveler that allows passengers to learn a new language in their own language. Appearing as a mixture of lessons and mini games, passengers can learn the basics of a new language while being entertained. Many more learning applications continue to appear in the IFE market.

=== Religious content ===
In several airlines from the Muslim world, the AVOD systems provide Qibla directions to allow Muslims to pray facing Mecca, as is required. Such airlines include Emirates, Turkish Airlines, Pakistan International Airlines, Etihad Airways, Malaysia Airlines, IranAir, Qatar Airways, Mahan Air, Royal Jordanian and Saudia. Saudia and Malaysia Airlines have built-in Qur'ans, the Islamic holy book, in e-book form, and Garuda Indonesia has a dedicated Qur'an channel. Saudia and Emirates have audio Qur'ans.

The AVOD systems on El Al aircraft feature an application that shows the current Zmanim (Jewish prayer times) throughout the flight, with a compass pointing in the direction of Jerusalem.

=== Censorship ===
Videos are often censored both to meet national laws and to avoid complaints from passengers. Removed content includes controversial religious and political topics, sexuality, violence, and aircraft crashes. Shortly after the release of the film Sully (2016), several major airlines did not include it due to the sensitive nature of the topic depicted in the film, the ditching of US Airways Flight 1549. However, Virgin Atlantic added the film to its on-board entertainment library "to celebrate the fantastic skills, training and dedication of airline pilots".

== Connectivity expansion ==
IFE has been expanded to include in-flight connectivity—services such as Internet browsing, text messaging, cell phone usage (where permitted), and emailing. In fact, some in the airline industry have begun referring to the entire in-flight-entertainment category as "IFEC" (in-flight entertainment and connectivity or in-flight entertainment and communication).

The aircraft manufacturer Boeing entered into the in-flight-connectivity industry in 2000 and 2001 with an offshoot called Connexion by Boeing. The service was designed to provide in-flight broadband service to commercial airlines; Boeing built partnerships with United Airlines, Delta, and American. In 2006 Boeing closed Connexion; industry analysts cited technology, weight, and cost issues. The Connexion hardware available at the time weighed an unacceptable 1,000 pounds (450 kg).

After Connexion was discontinued, other providers emerged to deliver in-flight broadband communication to airlines—notably satellite-based by Row 44, OnAir and AeroMobile, and air-to-ground connectivity via a cellular signal by Aircell. Many have tested and deployed in-flight connectivity for passengers. Industry expectations were that by the end of 2011 thousands of planes flying in the US would offer some form of in-flight broadband communication to passengers.

The system transitioned to wireless technology and supports access from personal devices. Passengers can connect their smartphones and tablets to the aircraft's main Wi-Fi system to access services such as visiting websites and playing online games, watching on board videos, checking maps & flight information, and ordering snacks directly through airline app from their devices.Some airlines offer complimentary Wi-Fi connectivity, while others charge a small fee in order to connect.

Starting in the 2020s, the deployment of some low-Earth orbit satellites, like Starlink has gradually addressed this issue. Internet speeds are reportedly comparable to those at home, with the market projected to reach thousands of aircraft.

Some IFE systems allow a passenger to call another by seat number or game together.

=== Satellite telephony ===
Some airlines provide satellite telephones, usually able to make but not receive calls, integrated into their system, located at strategic locations in the aircraft or integrated into the remote control used for passengers' in-flight entertainment. Some aircraft allow faxes and phone SMS ("texts") to be sent. A notable example of such a system was the Airfone which was used by several people on multiple aircraft during the September 11th attacks. This also allowed the passengers of United Airlines Flight 93 to know about the other hijackings, ultimately leading to the passengers revolting against the hijackers.

=== Mobile phone ===
As a general rule, mobile phone use while airborne is usually not just prohibited by the carrier, but also by regulatory agencies in the relevant jurisdiction (e.g. FAA and FCC in the US). However, with added technology, some carriers nonetheless allow the use of mobile phones on selected routes.

Emirates became the first airline to allow mobile phones to be used during flight. Using the systems supplied by telecom company AeroMobile, Emirates launched the service commercially on 20 March 2008. Installed first on an Airbus A340-300, AeroMobile is presently operating across the entire Emirates fleet of Boeing 777s and Airbus A380s.

Ryanair had previously aimed to become the first airline to enable mobile phone use in flight, but did not launch its system commercially until February 2009. The system was set up on 22 737-800 jets based at Dublin Airport, and had been fitted on Ryanair's 200+ fleet of 737-800 jets by 2010.

OnAir offers inflight mobile connectivity to a range of airlines through its GSM network, which connects to ground infrastructure via an Inmarsat SwiftBroadband satellite providing consistent global coverage.

=== Data communication ===
Intranet type communication systems have been introduced. Functionalities may include allowing passengers to chat with each other, compete against each other in provided games, talk to flight attendants, request and pay for food or drinks, and have full access to the Internet and email.

Several airlines are using in-cabin wi-fi systems. In-flight internet service is provided either through a satellite network or an air-to-ground network. In the Airbus A380 aircraft, data communication via satellite system allows passengers to connect to live Internet from the individual IFE units or their laptops via the in-flight Wi-Fi access.

Boeing's cancellation of the Connexion by Boeing system in 2006 caused concerns that inflight internet would not be available on next-generation aircraft such as Qantas's fleet of Airbus A380s and Boeing Dreamliner 787s. However, Qantas announced in July 2007 that all service classes in its fleet of A380s would have wireless internet access as well as seat-back access to email and cached web browsing when the Airbuses started operations in October 2008. Certain elements were also retrofitted into existing Boeing 747-400s.

As of 2010 sixteen major U.S. airlines offered Wi-Fi connectivity service on their aircraft. The majority of these airlines used the service provided by Gogo Wi-Fi service. The service allows Wi-Fi enabled devices to connect to the Internet. Delta had the most Wi-Fi equipped fleet, with 500 aircraft offering Wi-Fi. In 2019, some airlines removed seatback screens, saving money by streaming video to passenger personal mobile devices.

Virgin Australia also had an onboard Wi-Fi service, free on all domestic flights, paid on international flights. After their takeover by Bain capital, Virgin Australia discontinued live Internet access.

China Airlines and Singapore Airlines also have similar Wi-Fi services, charge according to time used.

Aircraft-based connectivity upstarts including Simi Valley, AWN and Aeronet Global Communications Services had been reducing operations as of 2019.

As of 2024, SpaceX and OneWeb were testing low Earth-orbit satellites, with Amazon seeking approval for more, and other companies were working on HAPS prototypes. Starting in 2026, hundreds of aircraft's IFE system from numerous full-service airlines will be retrofitted with this upgrade, delivering an in-flight TV and web experience comparable to that on the ground, including in-flight HD livestream.
