= Mobile phones on aircraft =

General procedures while onboard an aircraft

Mobile phone use on aircraft is governed by aviation-safety rules, telecommunications regulations, airline policies, and the technology fitted to an aircraft. Restrictions have been justified by concerns that transmissions from mobile phones and other portable electronic devices may interfere with avionics, and that phones operating at altitude may disrupt terrestrial cellular networks. Evidence concerning interference with aircraft systems has been mixed, and restrictions have also been supported for social reasons, particularly to limit the nuisance of in-flight voice calls.

Onboard systems such as picocells can allow mobile phones to connect at low power to equipment on the aircraft, which relays communications to external networks. Such technology has enabled some airlines to offer in-flight mobile services, including voice calls, while other airlines permit phones only with their transmitters disabled or impose other restrictions.

In the United States, Federal Communications Commission (FCC) regulations prohibit the operation of cellular telephones aboard aircraft while airborne. Federal Aviation Administration (FAA) rules separately govern the use of portable electronic devices on certain aircraft and allow an operator to permit a device if it has determined that the device will not interfere with the aircraft's navigation or communication systems. In Europe, the European Aviation Safety Agency removed its ban on mobile phone use during flights in 2014, allowing airlines to permit portable electronic devices to remain switched on and connected throughout a flight. Rules and airline policies elsewhere vary, with some allowing only airplane mode and others permitting mobile calls under specified conditions.

== History ==
A regulation, SR-446, prohibiting the usage of FM radios onboard aircraft at certain times was issued by the Federal Aviation Agency on 25 May 1961 in response to studies that showed they could interfere with VHF omnidirectional range navigation systems operating on the 108 to 118 MHz frequency band. Subsequent testing led to the expansion of the covered devices to all "portable electronic devices" in the first published rulemaking in 14 CFR 91.19 in 1966. (Note: The regulation was moved from Section 91.19 to Section 91.21 in 1989.) The Federal Communications Commission ban on use of cell phones in flight was promulgated in 1994.

== The debate on safety ==
In the United States, the Federal Communications Commission (FCC) restricts cell phone usage on aircraft in order to prevent disruption to cellular towers on the ground. As mentioned above, the FAA allows the in-flight use of wireless devices but only after the airline has determined that the device will not interfere with aircraft communication or navigation.

One study concluded that some "portable electronic devices", including laptops, electronic toys and laser pointers, used in the cabin can exceed the aircraft manufacturer's permissible emission levels for safety with regard to some avionics, while they were unsuccessful in duplicating any of the errors suspected to be caused by these devices' use in controlled lab conditions.

Since these regulations were originally imposed by various international aviation agencies, ultra-low-power devices, such as picocells, have been developed. Reasons for this include improved security, reduction of interference, and allowing safe in-flight use of mobile phones. Many airline companies have now added such equipment to their aircraft. More are expected to do so in the coming years.

=== Electromagnetic interference ===
Electromagnetic interference to aircraft systems is a common argument offered for banning mobile phones (and other passenger electronic devices) on planes. Theoretically, active radio transmitters like mobile phones, walkie-talkies, and wireless computer peripherals (such as mice or game controllers using Bluetooth or other wireless technologies) may interfere with the aircraft. Non-transmitting electronic devices also emit electromagnetic radiation, although typically at a lower power level, and could also theoretically affect the aircraft electronics. Collectively, any of these may be referred to as portable electronic devices (PEDs).

A NASA publication details the 50 most recent reports to the Aviation Safety Reporting System (ASRS) regarding "avionics problems that may result from the influence of passenger electronic devices." The nature of these reports varies widely. Some merely describe passengers' interactions with flight crews when asked to stop using an electronic device. Other reports amount to crews reporting an anomaly experienced at the same time a passenger was witnessed using a mobile phone. A few reports state that interference to aircraft systems was observed to appear and disappear as that particular suspect device was turned on and off. One entry in the ASRS, designated ACN: 440557, reports a clear link where a passenger's DVD player induced a 30-degree error in the display of the aircraft's heading, each time the player was switched on. However, this report dates back to 1999 and involves a Boeing 727, an old type of aircraft that is no longer in use by airlines today.

A 2003 study involved three months of testing with RF spectrum analyzers and other instruments aboard regular commercial flights, and one passage reads:

...our research has found that these items can interrupt the normal operation of key cockpit instruments, especially Global Positioning System (GPS) receivers, which are increasingly vital to safe landings. Two different studies by NASA further support the idea that passengers' electronic devices dangerously produce interference in a way that reduces the safety margins for critical avionics systems.
There is no smoking gun to this story: there is no definitive instance of an air accident known to have been caused by a passenger's use of an electronic device. Nonetheless, although it is impossible to say that such use has contributed to air accidents in the past, the data also make it impossible to rule it out completely. More importantly, the data support a conclusion that continued use of portable RF-emitting devices such as cell phones will, in all likelihood, someday cause an accident by interfering with critical cockpit instruments such as GPS receivers. This much is certain: there exists a greater potential for problems than was previously believed.

A 2000 study by the British Civil Aviation Authority found that a mobile phone, when used near the cockpit or other avionics equipment location, will exceed safety levels for older equipment (compliant with 1984 standards). Such equipment is still in use, even in new aircraft. Therefore, the report concludes, the current policy, which restricts the use of mobile phones on all aircraft while the engines are running, should remain in force.

Critics of the ban doubt that small battery-powered devices would have any significant influence on a commercial jetliner's shielded electronic systems. Safety researchers Tekla S. Perry and Linda Geppert point out that shielding and other protections degrade with increasing age, cycles of use, and even some maintenance procedures, as is also true of the shielding in PEDs, including mobile phones.

Several reports argue both sides of the issue in the same article; on the one hand they highlight the lack of definite evidence of mobile phones causing significant interference, while on the other hand they point out that caution in maintaining restrictions on using mobile phones and other PEDs in flight is the safer course to take.

== The debate on other issues ==
=== Social resistance to mobile phone use on flights ===
Many people may prefer a ban on mobile phone use in flight as it prevents undue amounts of noise from mobile phone chatter. AT&T has suggested that in-flight mobile phone restrictions should remain in place in the interests of reducing the nuisance to other passengers caused by someone talking on a mobile phone near them.

=== Competition for airlines' in-flight phone service ===
Skeptics of the ban have suggested that the airlines support the ban because they do not want passengers to have an alternative to the in-flight phone service such as GTE's Airfone. Andy Plews, a spokesman for UAL's United Airlines, was quoted as saying "We don't believe it's a good safety issue...We'd like people to use the air phones."

== Current status ==
=== In-flight technology ===
On 31 October 2013, the FAA issued a press release entitled "FAA to Allow Airlines to Expand Use of Personal Electronics" in which it announced that "airlines can safely expand passenger use of Portable Electronic Devices (PEDs) during all phases of flight." This new policy does not include cell phone use in flight, because, as the press release states, "The FAA did not consider changing the regulations regarding the use of cell phones for voice communications during flight because the issue is under the jurisdiction of the Federal Communications Commission (FCC)."

This FAA press release was quickly followed up by an FCC press release entitled "Chairman Wheeler Statement on In-Flight Mobile Services Proposal" in which FCC Chairman Tom Wheeler states, "modern technologies can deliver mobile services in the air safely and reliably, and the time is right to review our outdated and restrictive rules." This has led to media speculation that the use of cell phones for voice communication on board an aircraft in flight will soon be allowed.

Some airlines have installed technologies to allow phones to be connected within the airplane as it flies. Such systems were tested on scheduled flights from 2006 and in 2008 several airlines started to allow in-flight use of mobile phones.

=== Status of specific regions and individual airlines ===
==== China ====
As of 2018, Chinese regulations (and major carriers including China Southern Airlines, China Eastern Airlines and Air China) permit phone usage in flight mode (with transmitters off).

==== Emirates ====
On 20 March 2008, Emirates began allowing in-flight voice calls on some commercial flights.

==== European services ====
AeroMobile and OnAir allow the use of personal electronics devices aboard flights. The services are most readily available in Europe and are licensed to specific airlines.

==== Qantas ====
Since 26 August 2014, Qantas permits mobile phones (and other portable electronic devices weighing less than 1 kg; 2 lb) to be switched on during the entire flight, if the devices are in flight mode while on board the aircraft. Jetstar (owned by Qantas) adopted the same arrangements on 30 August 2014.

==== Ryanair ====
On 30 August 2006, the Irish airline Ryanair announced that it would introduce a facility to allow passengers to use their mobile phones in-flight. This service started on 19 February 2009 with 20 of their Dublin-based aircraft.

==== Turkish Airlines ====
Turkish Airlines' stated position is that "Mobile phones interfere with the flight instruments and have a negative effect on flight safety."

==== Mobile phones on corporate jets ====
Dassault Aviation implemented a new concept designated SafeCell on 2 April 2009 when the Falcon 2000 commenced flying.

==== United Kingdom ====
On 18 October 2007, the Office of Communications published proposals for the technical and authorisational approach that would be adopted to allow this for European GSM users on the 1800 MHz band on UK registered aircraft. and on 26 March 2008 Ofcom approved the use of mobile phone-supporting picocells aboard aircraft in the United Kingdom. Airline companies will have to first equip the aircraft with picocells and apply for licences.

=== United States ===
To prevent disruption to the cellular phone network from the effects of fast-moving cell phones at altitude (see Technical discussion, below), the FCC has banned the use of mobile phones on all aircraft in flight. The FCC did, however, allocate spectra in the 450 MHz and 800 MHz frequency bands for use by equipment designed and tested for air-ground radiotelephone service. These systems use far more widely separated ground stations than standard cellular systems. In the 450 MHz band co-channel assignments are at least 497 miles apart and in the 800 MHz band only specific sites were authorized by the FCC. The 450 MHz service is limited to "general aviation" users, usually corporate jets, while the 800 MHz spectrum can be used by airliners as well as for general aviation.

The FAA in 14 C.F.R § 91.21 prohibits the use of portable electronic devices, including mobile phones, for all commercial flights and for those private flights being made under instrument flight rules (IFR). It does allow that the airline (or, for privately operated aircraft, the pilot) can make an exception to this rule if the operator deems that device safe. This effectively gives the airline, or the private pilot, the final word as to what devices may safely be used aboard an aircraft as far as the FAA is concerned although the FCC restriction still applies. (Note that for aircraft operated by an airline the pilot is not considered the "operator" and cannot legally allow exceptions to the airline's restrictions although the pilot may dictate additional restrictions.) On February 11, 2014, the House Committee on Transportation and Infrastructure approved the Prohibiting In-Flight Voice Communications on Mobile Wireless Devices Act. The bill would forbid airline passengers from talking on mobile phones during a flight. In September 2014, a bipartisan group of lawmakers opposed the FCC ending the ban on mobile phones aboard, citing safety as one of the main concerns.

=== Europe ===
In September 2014, the European Aviation Safety Agency removed its ban on mobile phone use during flights. The new guidance allows airlines to permit portable electronic devices to stay switched on, without the need to be in 'Airplane Mode'. This enables the ability to offer 'gate-to-gate' telecommunication or WiFi services.

=== India ===
On 19 January 2018, the Telecom Regulatory Authority of India (TRAI) permitted the use of mobile phones and internet access through Wi-Fi on-board all flights operating in Indian airspace. However, passengers are only permitted to make mobile phone calls when the aircraft is at an altitude of over 3,000 metres (9,800 ft). TRAI stated that the height restriction was to ensure "compatibility with terrestrial mobile networks".

=== Future technologies ===
A few U.S. airlines have announced plans to install new technology on aircraft which would allow mobile phones to be used on aircraft, pending approval by the FCC and the FAA. This method is similar to that used in most cars on the German ICE train. The aircraft would carry a device known as a picocell. A picocell acts as a miniature base station (like a cellphone tower) communicating with cellphones within the aircraft and relaying the signals to either satellites or a terrestrial-based system. The picocell will be designed and maintained for full compatibility with the aircraft avionics. Communication between the picocell and the rest of the telephone network will be on separate frequencies that do not interfere with either the cellular system or the aircraft's avionics, similarly to the on–board proprietary phone systems already aboard many commercial aircraft. Since the picocell's antennas within the aircraft would be very close to the passengers and inside the aircraft's metal shell both the picocell's and the cell phones' output power could be reduced to very low levels, which would reduce the risk of interference. Such systems have been tested on a few flights within the United States under a waiver from the FCC.

ARINC and Telenor have formed a joint venture company to offer such a service aboard commercial aircraft. The cell phone calls are routed via satellite to the ground network and an on-board EMI screening system prevents the cell phones from attempting to contact ground-based networks.

These systems are comparatively easy to implement for customers in most of the world where GSM phones operating on one of just two bands are the norm. The multitude of incompatible mobile phone systems in the United States and some other countries makes the situation more difficult—it is not clear if the onboard repeaters will be compatible with all of the different cell-phone protocols (TDMA, GSM, CDMA, iDen) and their respective providers.

== Technical discussion ==
The U.S. Federal Communications Commission (FCC) currently prohibits the use of mobile phones aboard any aircraft in flight. The reason given is that cell phone systems depend on frequency reuse, which allows for a dramatic increase in the number of customers that can be served within a geographic area on a limited amount of radio spectrum, and operating a phone at an altitude may violate the fundamental assumptions that allow channel reuse to work. And since the aircraft is moving at a high speed, cell phones will try to reconnect to every base station it passes over, as cellular devices are meant to connect to a base station that has the strongest signal. This can cause interference with cellular services on the ground.

== See also ==
- Air-ground radiotelephone service
- Airplane mode
- Etiquette in technology
