= DirecTV for Business =

American television provider

- Industry: News, entertainment, sports programming
- Services: Pay television, satellite television, streaming television
- Parent: DirecTV
- Website: directv.com/forbusiness

DirecTV for Business is an American provider of satellite television and streaming services for commercial businesses, including 300,000 bars and restaurants, offices and retail, and other institutions, such as senior living communities, hospitals and on-campus university housing. DirecTV for Business is a division of DirecTV, LLC., and provides access to multichannel television services, including news, entertainment and sports programming.

== History ==
DirecTV for Business initially launched as part of DirecTV’s bars and restaurants unit in the 1990s. By offering television services specifically for commercial establishments, DirecTV for Business became an alternative entertainment source for broadcasting licensed sports games that would normally be prohibited.

On August 23, 2022, Amazon and DirecTV for Business entered into a multi-year carriage agreement to broadcast Thursday Night Football only to business customers.

In 2023, DirecTV for Business signed an exclusive deal with Apple TV+ to broadcast MLS Season Pass and Friday Night Baseball, which both packages include in-market and out of market teams from each respective league, to its business customers only. Later in 2023, it was also announced that DirecTV for Business would retain the rights to NFL Sunday Ticket for bars, restaurants and other commercial venues. This service was extended in 2026 through new multi-year terms, with DirecTV for Business handling sales, marketing and nationwide distribution of EverPass’ commercial rights portfolio.

In July 2024, DirecTV for Business announced a new next-generation set-top box as part of its Advanced Entertainment Platform, which delivers a mix of live TV, app-based, and on-demand content.

In October 2025, DirecTV for Business reached an agreement with Paramount+ to bring premium European soccer to commercial establishments with CBS Sports’ UEFA Champions League.

In January 2026, DirecTV for Business announced the launch of its new streaming TV solution for small businesses, including shops and retail stores, local bars and restaurants, private offices, medical waiting rooms, gyms or salon locations. DirecTV for Business announced in February 2026 that all Apple TV live sports content, including F1, MLS and MLB, would be “ingested directly into the DirecTV” user interface.

=== DirecTV In Flight ===
DirecTV for Business also provides entertainment offerings for both commercial and private airlines under its DirecTV In Flight brand.

In October 2023, it announced the launch of a domestic 18-channel TV lineup on select Boeing 767-400 aircraft flying select long-haul domestic routes to Delta customers through a relationship with Viasat. It launched an IPTV service for business aviation in collaboration with Satcom Direct, now known as Gogo, in August of the following year.

In April 2025, DirecTV In Flight became the first U.S.-based video provider to offer a live tv programming experience on international flights on select roundtrip United States flights. In October 2025, DirecTV In Flight and Airmont, an in-flight streaming service provider, partnered to provide JetVision by DirecTV to private aircraft. JetVision is DirecTV In Flight’s IPTV offering for private aircraft.

=== DirecTV Hospitality ===
DirecTV for Business provides access to entertainment offerings to U.S.-based hotel management groups, independent and managed hotel chains under its DirecTV Hospitality brand. As of 2026, DirecTV Hospitality is an approved vendor and preferred entertainment provider for Hyatt, Marriott International, and Best Western Hotels.

In October 2024, it entered a multi-year agreement with the American Hotel & Lodging Association that established DirecTV for Business as a Gold Partner for the hotel association.

DirecTV Hospitality announced a strategic agreement with Google in 2025 to integrate Google TV’s business-to-business version of the Android TV operating system into DirecTV’s Advanced Entertainment Platform.
