= Airplane mode =

Device setting to suspend radio-frequency signal transmission

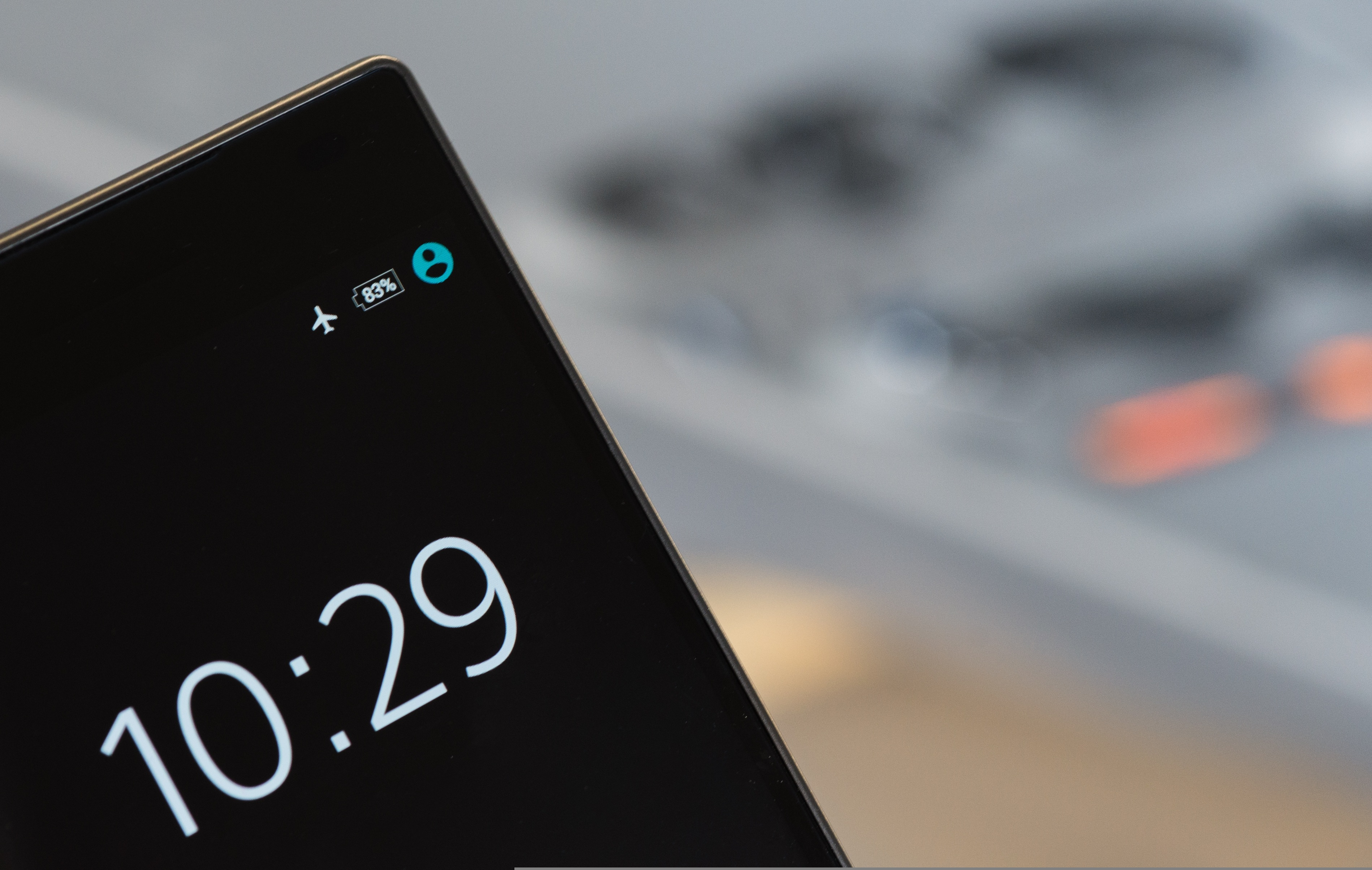
Smartphone with airplane mode turned on

Airplane mode icon

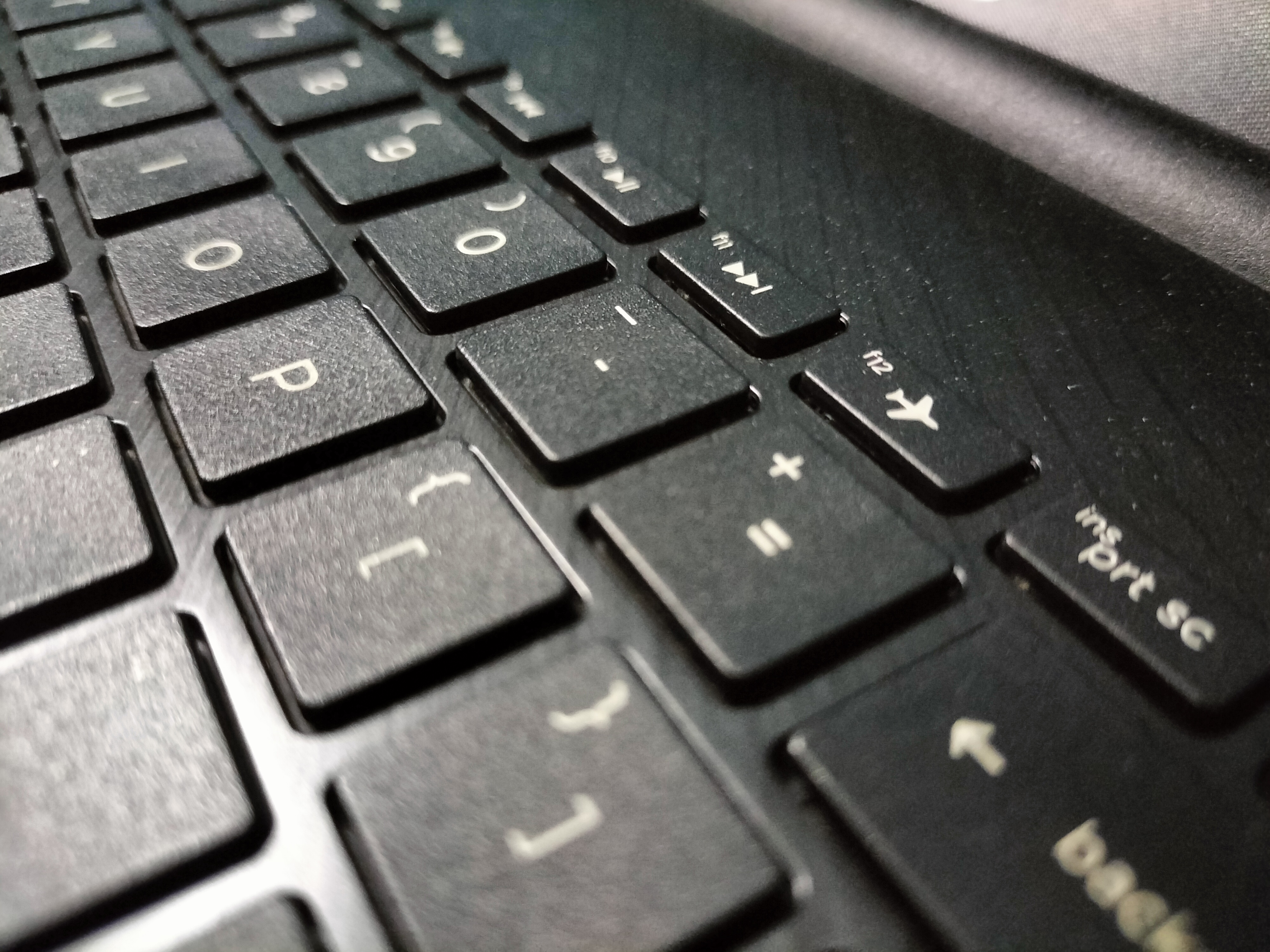
Airplane mode in a laptop keyboard on F12 key

Airplane mode (also known as aeroplane mode, flight mode, offline mode, flight safe mode or standalone mode) is a setting available on portable devices. When activated, the mode suspends the device's radio-frequency (RF) signal transmission technologies (i.e., Bluetooth, telephony and Wi-Fi), effectively disabling all analog voice, and digital data services, when implemented correctly by the electronic device software author.

The mode is so named because most airlines prohibit equipment that transmits RF signals, specifically mobile phones while in flight. The USA's Federal Communications Commission banned the airborne use of most cell phones and wireless devices in 1991 because of possible interference with airplane systems, despite there being no scientific evidence to support that possibility.

Typically, it is not possible to make phone calls or send messages in airplane mode, but some smartphones allow calls to emergency services. Most devices allow continued use of email clients and other mobile apps to write text or email messages. Messages are stored in memory to transmit later, once airplane mode is disabled. Wi-Fi and Bluetooth may be enabled separately while the device is in airplane mode, as allowed by the operator of the aircraft. Receiving RF signals (as by radio receivers and satellite navigation services) may not be inhibited by airplane mode; however, both transmitters and receivers are needed to receive calls and messages, even when not responding to them.

== Historical background ==
Airplane mode became common on mobile phones in the early 2000s as airlines began allowing passengers to keep devices powered on during flights, provided that wireless transmitters were disabled. This feature allowed phones to comply with aviation rules without requiring passengers to fully power down their devices.

== Legal status in various nations ==
=== European Union ===
On December 9, 2013, the European Aviation Safety Agency updated its guidelines on portable electronic devices (PEDs), allowing them to be used throughout the whole flight as long as they are set in Airplane mode. In November 2022, the EU announced its plans to enable 5G usage in airplanes using picocell, letting users make and receive calls and messages, and use data just as they would on the ground. On June 30, 2023, the deadline to implement was reached and airlines now can have picocells on airplanes.

=== China ===
Prior to September 2017, cell phones, even with airplane mode, were never allowed to be used during the flight although other devices can be used while in cruising altitude. On September 18, 2017, the Civil Aviation Authority of China relaxed these rules and allowed all Chinese air carriers to allow the use of portable electronic devices (PEDs) for the entire flight as long as they are in airplane mode.

=== India ===
On April 23, 2014, the Directorate General of Civil Aviation (DGCA) amended the rule which bans use of portable electronic devices and allowed their usage in all phases of flight.

=== United States ===
In a revised review in October 2013, the United States Federal Aviation Administration (FAA) made a recommendation on the use of electronic devices in airplane mode –cellular telephony must be disabled, whilst Wi-Fi may be used if the carrier offers it. Short-range transmission such as Bluetooth is permissible on aircraft that can tolerate it. The statement cites the common practice of aircraft operators whose aircraft can tolerate use of these personal electronic devices, but use may still be prohibited on some models of aircraft.

== See also ==
- Air gap (networking)
- Mobile phones on aircraft
- Picocell
