= Panasonic Avionics Corporation =

American in-flight entertainment supplier

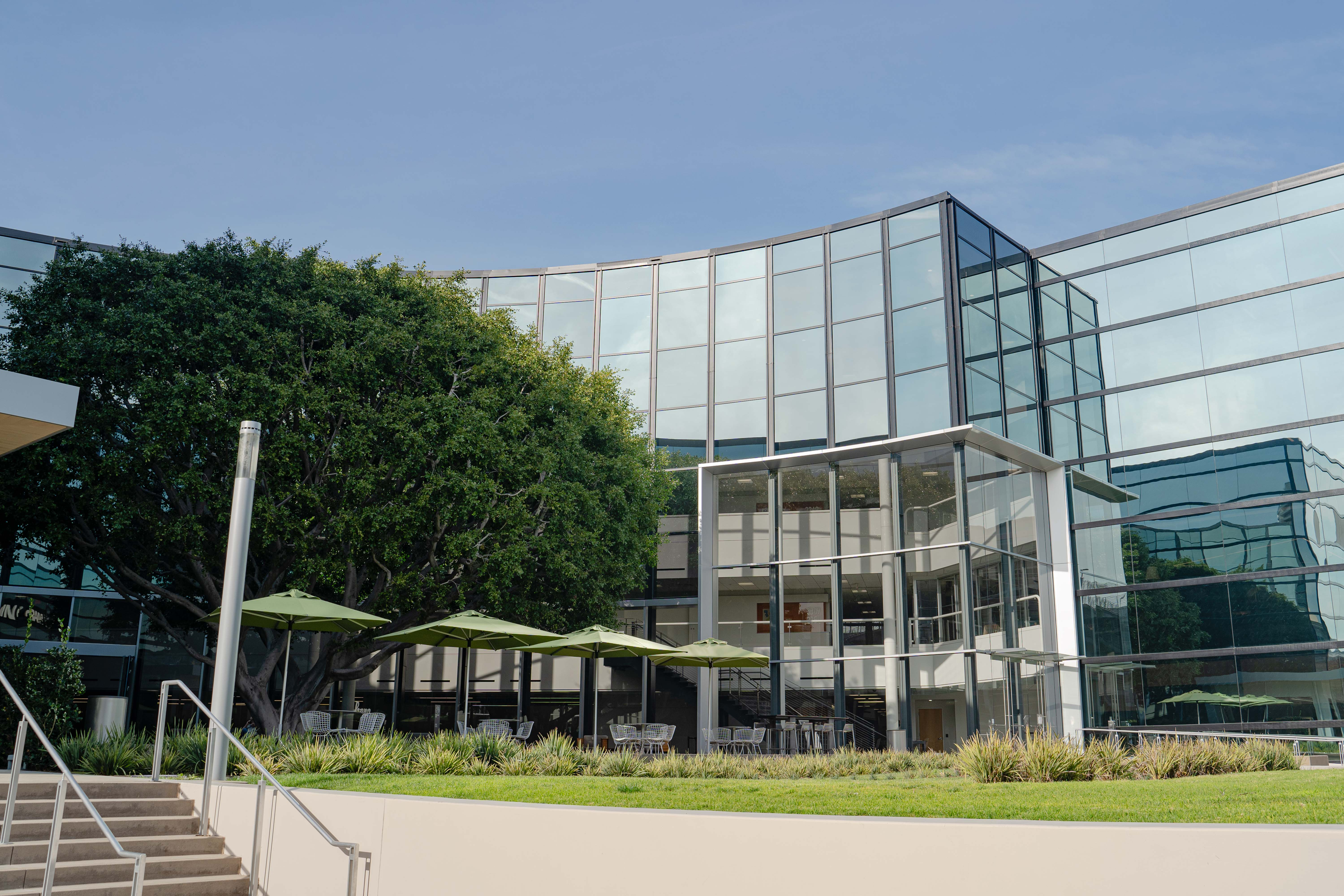
The headquarters of Panasonic Avionics Corporation in Irvine, California.

Panasonic Avionics Corporation (PAC) designs, engineers, manufactures, sells and installs customized in-flight entertainment and communications devices to airlines worldwide. It is a subsidiary of Panasonic Corporation of North America, the principal North American subsidiary of Panasonic Corporation, and operates under the umbrella of the Panasonic Connect group. Panasonic Avionics Corporation was founded in 1979 as Matsushita Avionics Systems Corporation and changed its name in 2005. It is headquartered in Irvine, California and has major business functions in Bothell, WA.

== Clients ==
PAC is a supplier of in-flight entertainment equipment, including music, video on demand (movies and television shows), in-flight shopping, phone service, email, video games, and GPS flight location display. PAC supplies equipment to Boeing, Airbus and Bombardier. Competitors in the IFE market include Thales Group, Collins Aerospace, Safran/Zodiac In-Flight Innovations and LiveTV.

In late 2009, Lufthansa announced that starting mid-2010 they will re-launch their 'FlyNet' service with Panasonic Avionics' satellite-based broadband technology offering passengers in-flight Internet and cellphone connections. Lufthansa will make use of their existing onboard hardware that had been installed in 2003 by Connexion by Boeing, the now defunct provider of the airline's previous onboard connectivity system.

== Operations ==
The product engineering and development departments are located in Irvine, CA; program management, certification, system installation engineering and quality are located in Bothell, Washington, and manufacturing is performed in Osaka, Japan. Other offices and repair facilities are located worldwide, with major offices in Toulouse, Hamburg, London, Dallas, Dubai and Singapore.

Panasonic Avionics Corporation is AS9100, ISO 14001, and ISO 27000 certified.

== Technology ==
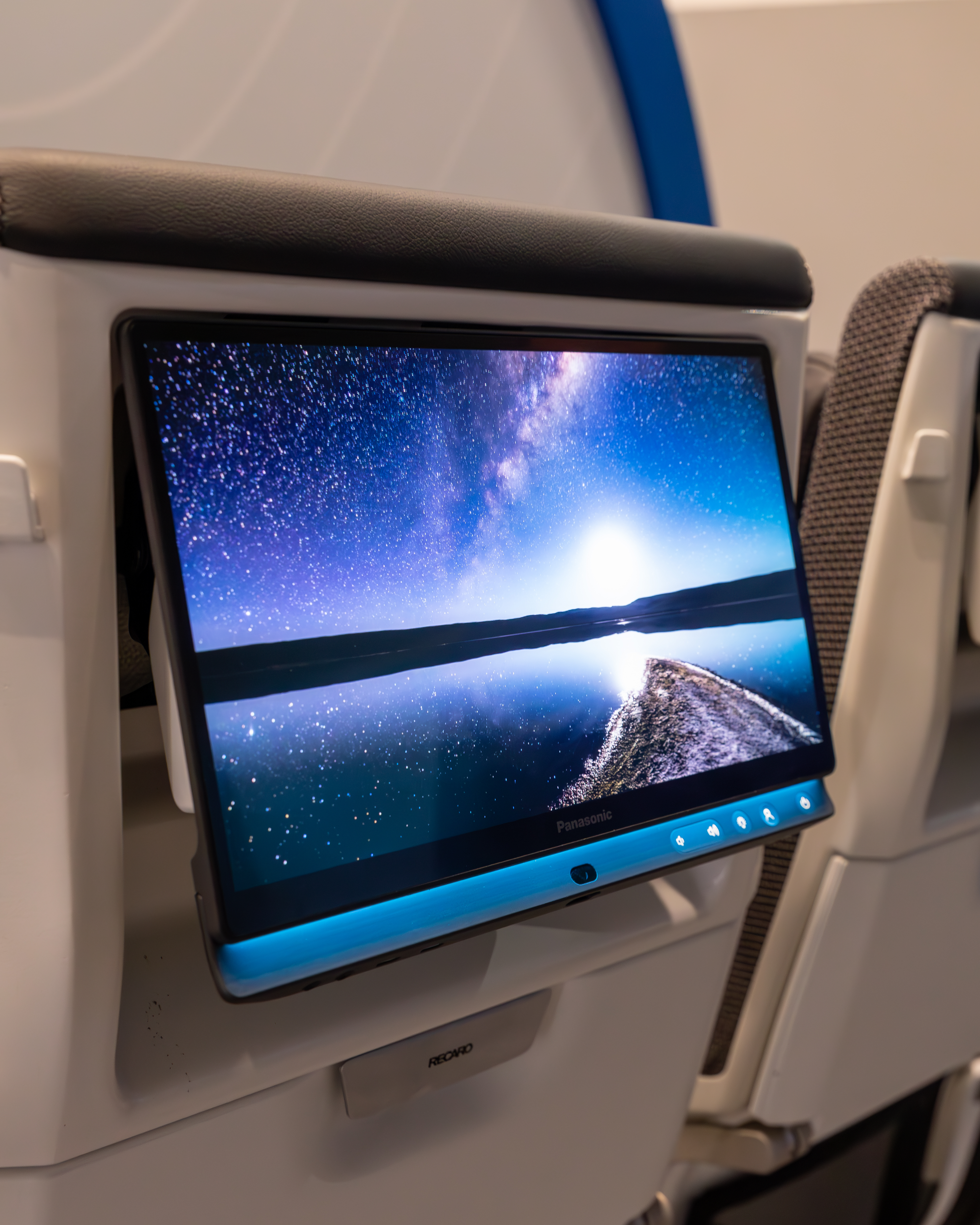
Panasonic Astrova personal 4K OLED TV

In 2017, Panasonic Avionics decided to cancel planned investment in geostationary satellites, in the wake of development in low Earth orbit satellite constellations. This decision could be due to potential future competition from the Starlink and OneWeb satellite constellations. One of the key technical differences is that low Earth orbit satellites provide shorter latencies, because the signal doesn't have to travel 35,786 km (22,236 mi) back and forth to the geostationary orbit.

== Controversy ==
In March 2013, it was reported that American authorities were investigating the subsidiary for bribery. In February 2017, Panasonic said that PAC was being investigated by the DOJ and the SEC under the FCPA. In December 2018, the former CEO and CFO of the company settled with the SEC and agreed to pay a total of $280 million to the Department of Justice and the SEC.

== See also ==
- AeroMobile
- Aircell
- FlyNet
