= Tenzing Communications =

In-flight telecommunications company

- Industry: In-flight telecommunications
- Headquarters: Seattle

Tenzing Communications of Seattle was founded in 1999 by David Coe a small group of private investors and Simon "Symonty" Gresham. Initial funding the key software developed by Symonty. Further development funding was raised from private equity sources and in 2001 Airbus, Cathay Pacific and Rockwell Collins became shareholders. The firm had intended to launch in-flight data services, including text messaging, instant messaging, and email using broadband satellite receivers using Inmarsat's fourth-generation satellite system. However, the satellites were not launched until March 2005 (I4 F1), November 2005 (I4 F2) and planned April 2008 for the final Pacific Ocean Region, I4 F3.

The first installation and email transmission was on an Air Canada 767 on August 26, 2000.

In 2001, after the September 11 attacks in New York, the FAA would not allow travelers to carry bags or laptops in the passenger cabin, this derailed the company and it followed up by laying off 90% of its workforce.

In the interim, Tenzing deployed a very-low-bandwidth system in partnership with Verizon AirFone's radiotelephone network. This system was in commercial operation on United Airlines and a few other U.S. carriers for more than a year before being discontinued.

In 2004, Tenzing merged its operations into a new company, OnAir, formed with SITA and Airbus. OnAir originally intended to introduce broadband and in-flight cell services in 2005, but further delays in Inmarsat's satellite launches and other factors put inflight trials back until early 2008 and first announced customer launch on Kingfisher Airlines mid-2009.
