= Gogo Inflight Internet =

American in-flight Internet service provider

Gogo Inc.
- Type: Public
- Traded as: Nasdaq: GOGO
- Industry: Aviation; Technology
- Founded: 1991; 35 years ago
- Founder: Jimmy Ray
- Headquarters: Broomfield, Colorado, U.S.
- Area served: Worldwide
- Key people: Chris Moore (CEO)
- Products: In-flight entertainment; In-flight connectivity
- Revenue: ▲US$335.7 million (2021)
- Operating income: ▲US$120.6 million (2021)
- Net income: ▲US$152.7 million (2021)
- Total assets: ▲US$647.7 million (2021)
- Total equity: ▼US$-320.2 million (2021)
- Number of employees: 376
- Divisions: Gogo Business Aviation
- Website: gogoair.com

Gogo Inc. is an American provider of in-flight broadband Internet service and other connectivity services for business aircraft, headquartered in Broomfield, Colorado. Through its Gogo LLC subsidiary, Gogo previously provided in-flight WiFi to 17 airlines until the Commercial Air business was sold to Intelsat for $400 million in December 2020. According to Gogo, over 2,500 commercial aircraft and 6,600 business aircraft have been equipped with its onboard Wi-Fi services. The company is the developer of 2Ku, new in-flight satellite-based Wi-Fi technology rolled out in 2015.

== History ==
Gogo began in 1991 in a barbecue restaurant in Denison, Texas, where company founder Jimmy Ray sketched his idea for an affordable telephone system for private airplanes on a paper napkin. John D. Goeken of MCI and Airfone had already invented an automated air-to-ground telephone system in the 1970s, and in 1989, he founded In-Flight Phone Corporation as a competitor to GTE Airfone, serving many commercial airline passengers, but not supplying general aviation customers. Through a partnership with cellular providers, Gogo began as Aircell, providing analog-based voice communications on private aircraft in North America. By the late 1990s, Gogo had leveraged a satellite-based system to offer voice communication on overseas flights. The next step was to devise a way to bring in-air connectivity to a larger market. In 2006, Gogo was awarded the U.S. Federal Communications Commission's exclusive Air-To-Ground (ATG) 3 GHz broadband frequency license. In 2008, Gogo made their debut on commercial aircraft.

In June 2011, the company changed its name from Aircell to Gogo as part of a rebranding effort. Prior to the rebrand, Gogo's commercial air service was known as "Gogo Inflight Internet". In September 2014, Aircell rebranded as Gogo Business Aviation.

On June 20, 2013, Gogo announced that it priced its initial public offering of 11 million shares of common stock at $17 per share. Gogo's shares started trading June 21, 2013, on the NASDAQ Global Select Market under the ticker symbol "GOGO".

In June 2015, the company moved its commercial headquarters to 111 North Canal Street in downtown Chicago. As of August 3, 2016, Gogo's had partnerships with 17 major commercial airlines and was installed on nearly 2,500 commercial aircraft and over 6,800 business aircraft. The company had over 1,000 employees. In addition to its Chicago headquarters, Gogo had facilities in Broomfield, CO, and various locations overseas.

In December 2020, the company announced that it had completed sale of its commercial aviation business to Intelsat for $400 million in cash and would focus exclusively on the business aviation market moving forward.

In late 2024, Gogo Business Aviation acquired Satcom Direct. The remaining company rebranded to Gogo.

== Technologies ==
From oldest to newest, below are the technologies that Gogo currently uses, has developed, or announced:

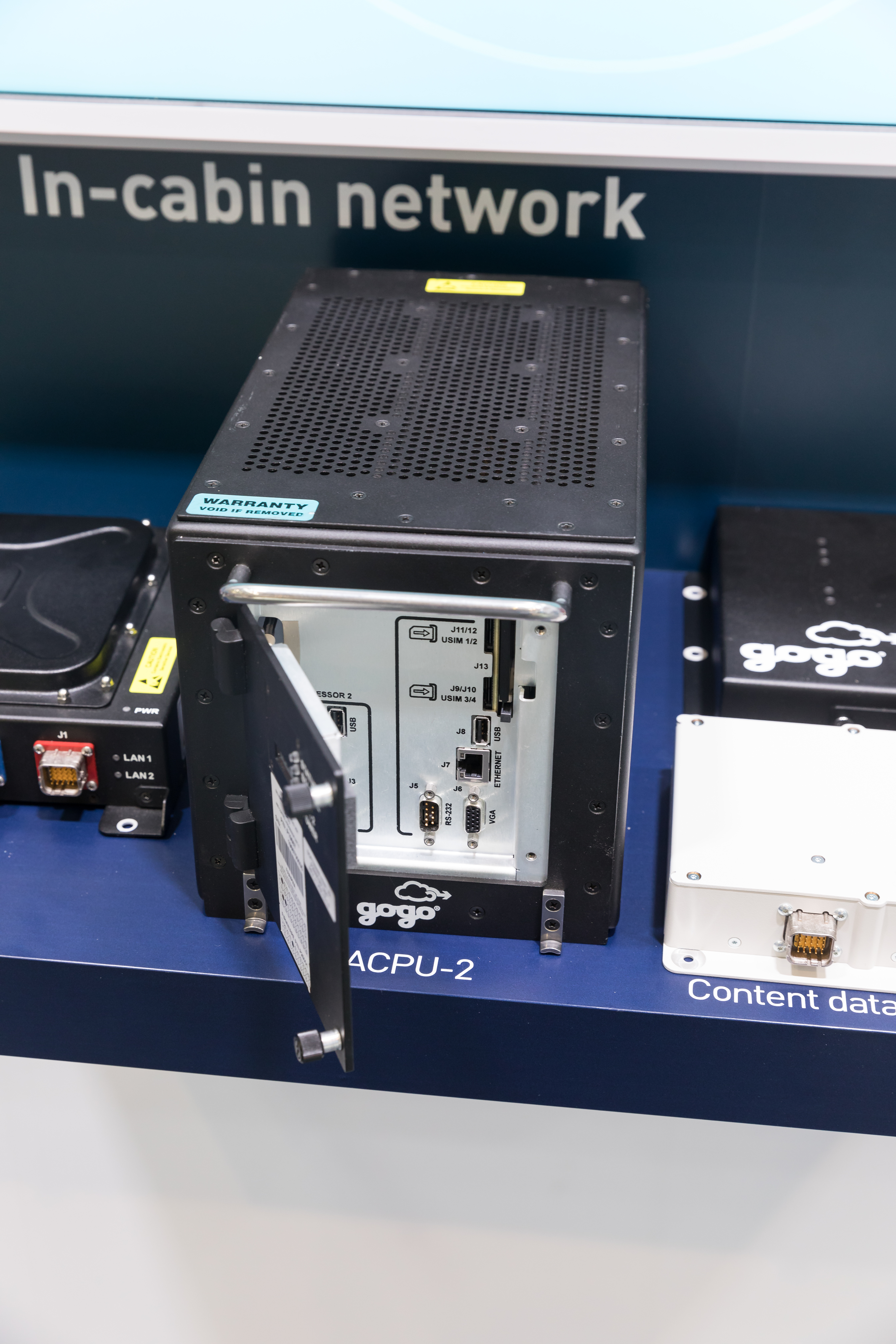
Gogo ACPU-2 (Airborne Control Processor Unit), the server placed onboard aircraft

=== Air-to-ground ===
Gogo's air-to-ground (ATG) network is a cellular radio network (meaning that there is a hand-off when the aircraft moves between service areas) that has more than 200 towers in the continental U.S. and Canada. The ground stations consist of original Airfone air-ground phone relay stations and newer locations, using the 850 MHz ATG band. Unlike terrestrial cell sites, ATG ground stations project a directional signal up into the air where airplanes are, rather than downward, where terrestrial users are. However, the short wavelength used allows segmentation and other cellular technologies in the same way that terrestrial cellphone technology works. The aircraft communicates with the ground stations through an antenna installed on the underbelly of the fuselage. Equipment in the aircraft's avionics bay converts between proprietary Gogo protocols and standard Wi-Fi, which is distributed into the passenger cabin through multiple interior wireless access point nodes.

Gogo provides continuous coverage with minimal interruptions in speed, detected when passing from one cell tower signal to the next. Gogo's connection speed is approximately 500–600 kilobits per second for individual users for downloads and 300 kbit/s for uploads. Total bandwidth for all users on the flight is approximately 3 Mbit/s. Some users reported Speedtest.net benchmarks above 3 Mbit/s, while other users reported low results of 0.03 Mbit/s down and 0.27 up. In January 2015, David P. Reed reported that Gogo service exhibited multiple seconds of latency under load, due to bufferbloat.

=== ATG-4 ===
Gogo's ATG-4 system is a backwards compatible improvement to the previous ATG system. Maximum total download bandwidth has increased from 3.1 Mbit/s to 9.8 Mbit/s. ATG-4 has been installed on at least 600 aircraft as of 2015. Gogo can upgrade planes from ATG to ATG-4 overnight.

ATG-4 is powered by EV-DO Rev B, one of the only production applications of the B-revision to EV-DO as part of the CDMA2000 standard.

=== Ku-band satellite ===
Gogo has satellite agreements in place with SES (for coverage over the U.S., Atlantic Ocean, and Europe) and Intelsat (for coverage over portions of the Atlantic and northern Pacific oceans, as well as routes over South America, Asia, Africa, and Australia). Gogo has also signed an agreement with Intelsat for K_{u} band satellite capacity, specifically for coverage in the Atlantic and northern Pacific oceans, as well as routes over Central and South America, Asia, Australia, and parts of Africa. Gogo announced in May 2012 that it would partner with satellite equipment provider, AeroSat, to bring a Ku-satellite communications to commercial airlines, allowing Gogo to offer airlines connectivity services that extend beyond the United States, including transoceanic routes, and will serve the needs of some of their airline partners in the near-term until Inmarsat's Global Xpress K_{a} band-satellite becomes available. Gogo's Ku-band satellite technology is used for Gogo's Ground to Orbit and 2Ku.

==== Gogo Ground to Orbit ====
Gogo Ground to Orbit uses a Ku-band satellite antenna for the downlink to the plane and Gogo's Air to Ground for uplink from the plane. Ground to Orbit is in service over the United States, providing peak download speeds of 60 Mbit/s. Virgin America was the launch partner of this service. The Ku-band satellite antennas used for GTO are manufactured by ThinKom Solutions.

==== 2Ku ====
2Ku, Gogo's newest technology, uses two Ku-band antennas, one for download and the other for upload. Gogo claims that 2Ku will have peak speeds of 70 Mbit/s and has a low-profile 17 cm (6.69 in) tall radome. Like Ground to Orbit, the Ku-band antennas are manufactured by ThinKom Solutions. Aeroméxico was the first airline to commit to using 2Ku.

Gogo was determined to expand markets for its 2Ku service. On November 13, 2015, the company demonstrated 2Ku for two dozen aviation and technology reporters aboard a Boeing 737. The system was able to stream high-definition videos. It was a small horde of “data-hungry journalists on board all trying to kill the system,” said Jason Rabinowitz, manager of data research for Routehappy. Gogo claimed that the service can provide speeds up to 70 megabits per second, with 100 Mbit/s to be available when satellite-beaming techniques are perfected.

Actual speed is less impressive, as discussed in a TechTimes summary of some journalists' findings during the November 13, 2015 trials. "Speedtest rated it at 11.71 Mbit/s downloads, a 656-millisecond ping and uploads of 0.53 Mbit/s on my first try," said Timothy J. Seppala from Engadget. He added that one drawback is the ping time, which varies between 500 and 1000 milliseconds. The Verge's Chris Welch, meanwhile, observed that upload speeds were almost nonexistent, but stressed that casual Internet users seldom need to upload anything larger than a picture or a Vine video anyway. As for streaming, it works brilliantly when [used by] only 18 people." Total bandwidth on the media flight was capped at 25 Mbit/s.

A Gogo press release in September 2015 stated that a Japan Airlines member, JTA, was then the most recent company to order 2Ku connectivity for its 737-800 aircraft. More recently, in a November 12, 2015 press release the company indicates that "8 airlines representing more than 550 aircraft have adopted the [2ku] technology for fleet deployment or a trial of the service." More specifically, in addition to Aeroméxico which already has 2Ku-equipped jets in the air, Virgin Airlines and Delta Air Lines confirmed orders for 2ku service, Gogo CEO Michael Small told Bloomberg Business. More than 1,200 aircraft committed to receiving 2Ku. In February 2019, Alaska Airlines announced a rollout of the 2Ku service to their fleet, with a goal of half of their main fleet activated on the service by 2020. They claim 2Ku will allow passengers to stream online content.

=== Products ===
Gogo platform
Gogo's in-air platform gives travelers information, services, and entertainment while the airlines are able to display airline-specific information.
Gogo Text and Talk
Gogo Text enables passengers can send and receive text messages from their mobile phones. Gogo Talk lets passengers make and receive voice calls. In September 2014, T-Mobile US announced a new agreement with Gogo to provide customers with free unlimited WiFi text and multimedia messaging while on board a Gogo WiFi-equipped flight from a U.S.-based airline.
Gogo Vision
Gogo Vision streams movies and TV shows from an onboard server. In July 2014, Gogo launched Delta Studio with Delta Air Lines offering passengers a variety of television shows and movies that will be streamed wirelessly to passengers' own Wi-Fi enabled devices.
Gogo TV
Gogo TV will enable airlines to deliver live television content to passengers own Wi-Fi enabled device. Channel options will be customized by the airline so it will allow passengers to watch popular networks in their country or region. The service currently will only be available to airlines that select Gogo's 2Ku technology. The first airline to commit to Gogo TV is Gol.

== Connectivity ==
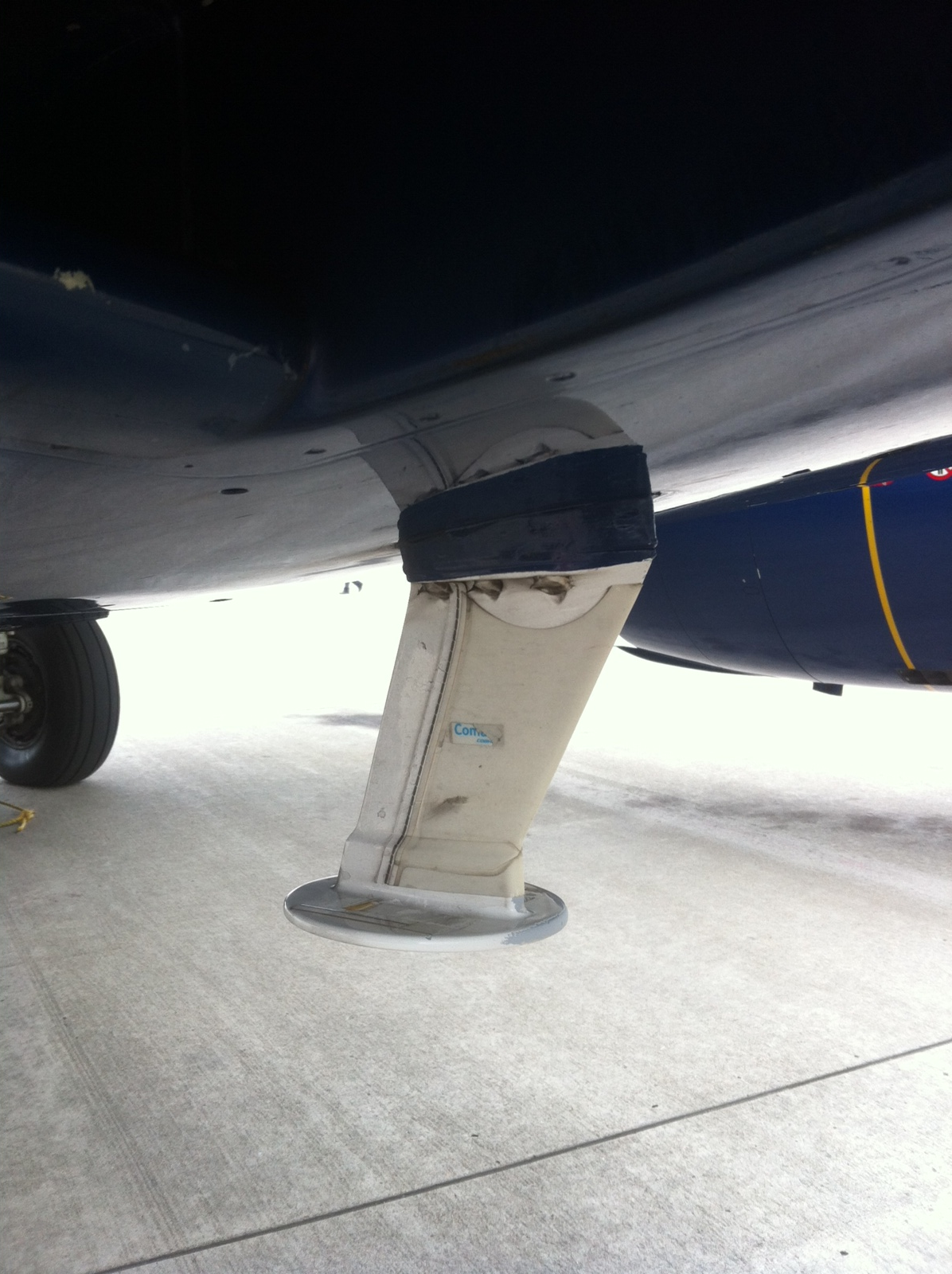
External Aircraft Antenna

The Gogo service is compatible with any device that has Wi-Fi capability. Users connect to the gogoinflight network and register in the same way they would on the ground. The network becomes accessible as soon as electronic devices are approved for use after take-off. The service includes account management and allows purchasing service before the flight using the product web site. VoIP applications are prohibited by the terms of service.

The connection onboard can be similar (under optimal conditions) to the experience with Wi-Fi hotspots, such as coffee shops and hotels. Users have previously reported connectivity issues when streaming video.

== Participating airlines ==
As of 2019, Gogo was found on Aeroméxico, Aer Lingus, Air Canada, Alaska Airlines, American Airlines, British Airways, Cathay Pacific Airways, Delta Air Lines, GOL, Hainan Airlines, Iberia, Japan Airlines, JTA, United Airlines, Vietnam Airlines, Virgin Atlantic and Virgin Australia. In-flight entertainment partners include American Airlines, Alaska Airlines, Air Canada, Aeromexico, Delta Air Lines, Japan Airlines, JTA, GOL, Hainan Airlines, United Airlines and Scoot. When they were in business it was used by AirTran Airways, US Airways, and Virgin America.

Historically, Gogo service began on American Airlines in July 2008. The first routes served were JFK to San Francisco, JFK to LAX, and JFK to Miami. As of 2010, they are expanding to include Gogo service on the full American Airlines domestic fleet.

On August 5, 2008, Delta Air Lines announced it would install Gogo on all its domestic aircraft, which has since been completed. A 2009 merger with Northwest Airlines added to the fleet. By early April 2010, 437 of 540 aircraft in the combined domestic fleet offered Wi-Fi, with remaining installations expected by summer 2010.

Virgin America became the first airline with fleetwide in-flight Internet access, in March 2009.

On July 14, 2009, AirTran Airways completed installation of Gogo on 136 of its aircraft. AirTran Airways merged with Southwest Airlines in 2010. AirTran's Boeing 737s have been converted to Southwest's Row 44 in-flight Wi-Fi, and their Boeing 717s have been leased to Delta Air Lines and use Delta's Gogo service.

October 2, 2009 saw the launch of Gogo on United Airlines' p.s. Flight 23 from New York to Los Angeles. The company installed Gogo on the entire United p.s. fleet before November 6, 2009.

On November 20, 2009, Gogo announced that Air Canada began trials of the Gogo system on select Toronto-Los Angeles and Montreal-Los Angeles flights which occur in large part over the continental US.

On February 24, 2010, Alaska Airlines announced that it will offer Gogo on its full fleet. The full fleet installation was completed in the fall of 2011.

On March 29, 2010, US Airways announced that all its Airbus A321 fleet would offer Gogo by June 1, 2011. The full fleet installation was completed in the fall of 2011.

On February 5, 2012 Frontier Airlines announced that it had equipped all of its Embraer E190 aircraft with Gogo to begin service on February 6, 2012.

On June 8, 2012, Gogo announced that Delta Air Lines will begin offering in-flight Internet service on its long-haul international fleet of more than 150 aircraft, which includes Boeing 747, 767, 777, Airbus A330 and transoceanic Boeing 757 aircraft in early 2013.

On June 20, 2012, Gogo announces that they have extended its contract with United Airlines to upgrade its p.s. fleet to Gogo's new ATG-4 connectivity service.

On August 28, 2012, Gogo announced that Industry Canada has issued Gogo a subordinate license for Canada's ATG radio frequency spectrum that will allow Gogo to serve passengers on commercial and business aircraft flying over Canada.

On January 11, 2013, Gogo announced that it will install two in-flight connectivity solutions to American Airlines' new Airbus A320 family and Boeing 737 deliveries: Ku-band satellite and Gogo's next generation Air to Ground technology - ATG-4.

On October 8, 2013, Gogo announced that Japan Airlines will begin offering in-flight Internet service on its domestic fleet of 77 aircraft, which includes Boeing 737, 767, 777, and 787 aircraft.

On November 8, 2013, Gogo announced Gogo Text & Talk, an app that provides in-flight cell phone calls, and text messaging. As of 2013, the product was to be officially launched on commercial jets in 2014.

On March 30, 2017, Gogo announced that Virgin Australia will begin offering in-flight Internet service on its fleet of Boeing 737-800, Airbus A330 and Boeing 777 aircraft.

== Surveillance support ==
In April 2014, it was revealed through a U.S. Federal Communications Commission letter that Gogo partnered with government officials to voluntarily develop capabilities to share user data with law enforcement beyond what is required under the federal Communications Assistance for Law Enforcement Act.

In 2014, Adrienne Porter Felt, a Google security engineer, discovered during a flight on a Gogo internet–equipped plane that Gogo uses fake SSL authentication, carrying out "a man-in-the-middle attack on their users", to capture user activity. This deliberately fake authentication may be to enable law-enforcement monitoring and also data mining of secure communications The company was criticized by Symantec for this issue. "Gogo has a legitimate interest in limiting or blocking video streaming, but the way they’ve done it is far overreaching." It is not known how long Gogo continued the strategy, but as a news site for the information security community indicated, the issuing of fake SSL Certificates has other risks for the user. "A cyber criminal 'acting' as Gogo could have performed many tasks without you ever realizing, such as blocking or censoring websites, capturing plain or encrypted data, installing malware, or even stealing passwords."

== Criticism of business model ==
It has been observed that Gogo practices a "roach motel"-type business model that makes it easy to sign up for service via automated means but requires interaction with a customer service representative to effect an immediate cancellation. However, service for next and future months may be cancelled via email. By making it easy to begin paying for service but requiring a recurring monthly subscription, even when a shorter term of service may be desired, Gogo makes it likely for infrequent flyers to be billed in subsequent months for a service they do not intend to use. In addition Gogo does not send monthly statements, so customers are not alerted to the recurring charges. The service does offer 1-hour and 24-hour passes that do not incur a recurring charge; however, this does not change the fact that even those limited-time services are significantly harder to stop than to initiate. Gogo claims that to "cancel service is as easy as signing up for it" and directs subscribers to engage in online chat, send email or call via telephone. In contrast, however, the sign-up process does not require human interaction.

== Class-action lawsuit ==
In 2013, Gogo was the subject of a class-action lawsuit, for allegedly not mentioning recurring charges on their website, nor notifying customers that these recurring charges would be made. A New York federal judge, Jack Weinstein, ruled on April 8, 2015, that the suit (Berkson, et al. v. Gogo LLC, Case No. 14-CV-1199, in the U.S. District Court for the Eastern District of New York) for claims that the company tricked consumers into signing up for automatic monthly renewal of Wi-Fi connections was allowed to move forward. In an 83-page memorandum and order of the case, the judge wrote, "the average internet user would not have been informed ... that he was binding himself to a sign-in-wrap" and that the wrap contract "does not support the venue and arbitration clauses relied upon by defendants." The case was settled with users receiving complimentary one-day passes to use on the service.

== See also ==
- Boingo Wireless
- Connexion by Boeing
- OnAir
- Panasonic Avionics Corporation
