= LiveTV =

In-flight entertainment provider

LiveTV, LLC.
- Formerly: In-Flight Phone Corporation
- Type: Subsidiary
- Founded: 1997; 29 years ago
- Founder: Harris Corporation; BE Aerospace
- Defunct: 2014
- Fate: Acquired by Thales Group
- Headquarters: Melbourne, Florida
- Products: in-flight entertainment
- Owner: JetBlue (2002-2014); Thales Group (2014 - Present)

LiveTV was a major provider of airline in-flight entertainment systems. Originally a joint venture of Harris Corporation and BE Aerospace (BE Aerospace's interest subsequently sold to Thales Group), it was a wholly owned subsidiary of JetBlue Airways Corporation from its acquisition in 2002 until its sale to Thales in 2014. It had its headquarters in Melbourne, Florida.

The company was one of the "big four" manufacturers of in-flight entertainment systems, along with Panasonic Avionics Corporation, Thales Group, and Rockwell Collins.

== History ==
Harris corporation developed a concept to provide live television to aircraft via satellite relay and subsequently patented the approach. In 1992 Harris contacted In-Flight Phone to explore the opportunity for commercial aircraft. In-Flight Phone contracted Harris to develop a concept demonstration for an ATG system to deliver live radio to commercial aircraft leveraging in-Flight Phone's experimental license. After completing this demonstration, In-Flight Phone contracted Harris to develop a satellite based Live TV system. When in-Flight Phone declared bankruptcy, Harris was a creditor with 50% of the development cost ~4.5 million dollars unpaid. As part of the settlement with In-Flight Phone's creditors for a carried interest, BE Aerospace and Harris formed a joint venture in 1998 called LiveTV; to complete development and commercialization of in-seat satellite TV for commercial aircraft. In June 2006, Live TV won a 1 MHz wide block of frequencies in the 800 MHz air-ground telephone auction conducted by the U.S. Federal Communications Commission (FCC). This license will allow air-ground-air communications to take place. An affiliate of Aircell was the winner of the larger 3 MHz wide block of frequencies. Plans for utilizing these frequencies had not been announced by mid-2007.

On June 9, 2008, JetBlue announced that it will buy Verizon's Airfone (Formerly: GTE Airfone, Formerly: Airfone) service.

Continental Airlines began to add LiveTV to all of its Boeing 737 Next Generation and Boeing 757-300 aircraft beginning in January 2009.

In March 2011, LiveTV announced it would install on-board Wi-Fi connectivity for over 200 United Airlines aircraft, using the ViaSat Ka-band satellite service. United was the second airline to announce the rollout of this high speed internet service, since LiveTV's parent company, JetBlue, entered an MOU with ViaSat in September 2010 in order to equip 160 JetBlue aircraft.

On March 13, 2014, Reuters reported that the division would be sold to Thales for $400 million. The sale was completed in June 2014 for $399 million in cash.

== Operations ==
=== Headquarters ===
The LiveTV headquarters was in one 52,000 square feet (4,800 m^{2}) building in the Airport Commercial Park along South Babcock Street in Melbourne, Florida. In 2008 the company was headquartered in a total of 22,000 square feet (2,000 m^{2}) of space in a group of five buildings in the Gateway Business Center in Melbourne. During that year the company announced plans to move to the Airport Commercial Park. In 2008 the company threatened to move its headquarters to Orlando if it did not receive tax breaks. The City of Melbourne, Brevard County, and the State of Florida gave $164,000 in incentives, so the headquarters moved to a new facility in Melbourne. As of that year the Melbourne headquarters has engineering, finance, marketing and sales personnel.

=== Other facilities ===
In addition, LiveTV had a facility on the grounds of Orlando International Airport in Orlando. As of 2008 the facility has a hangar, office space, and a warehouse.

Other offices include:

- Calgary, Alberta
- Denver, Colorado
- Fort Lauderdale, Florida
- Long Beach, California
- New York, New York
- Oakland, California
- Turkey, Matbet TV
- Kenya, Jojobet TV
- England, Taraftarium24 Club

== Products ==
Its main product was in aircraft seat-back satellite television service, XM Satellite Radio, and movie programming. The system also offers live flight trackers, for people to see where they are.

=== Satellite Television Providers ===
Depending on the region the airline operates in, different satellite television providers are utilized.

- (United States) DirecTV
- (Canada) Bell Satellite TV
- SKY Brazil

=== Airlines Used LiveTV Products ===
==== Currently ====
The following list of airlines currently have the LiveTV System on their Aircraft.

- (United States) JetBlue Airways
- (United States) United Airlines
- (Canada) WestJet
- (Brazil) Azul Brazilian Airlines
- (Turkey) Turkish Airlines

==== Formerly ====
The following list of airlines have since removed the LiveTV System from their aircraft.

- (United States) Frontier Airlines
- Virgin Australia
