= Connexion by Boeing =

Internet formerly offered by Boeing

Logo of Connexion by Boeing

Connexion by Boeing (CBB) was an in-flight online internet connectivity service from Boeing. This service allowed travellers to access a high-speed internet connection while on board a plane in flight through a wired Ethernet or a wireless 802.11 Wi-Fi connection. Connexion by Boeing was formed as a separate business unit of The Boeing Company. Major development on the service commenced with a partnership agreement between United Airlines, Delta Air Lines, and American Airlines on June 13, 2001. Lufthansa joined the partnership as the International launch customer on June 17, 2001. United, Delta, and American subsequently withdrew from the partnership after the 9/11 terrorist attacks due to the severe drop in airline travel that occurred after the attacks.

== Infrastructure ==
The infrastructure initially used a phased array K_{u} band antenna manufactured by Boeing and later a reflector antenna developed and manufactured by Mitsubishi Electric Corporation on the aircraft, leased satellite transponders, and ground stations. The service provided downlink speeds of up to 20 Mbit/s and uplink speeds up to 2 Mbit/s. Speed varied due to many factors including resource availability, aircraft location, and regulatory restrictions. A license from the U.S. Federal Communications Commission (FCC) was first received on December 27, 2001. The United Kingdom subsequently on July 24, 2002 granted Boeing a license for operating over its territory. Other nations followed in granting operating licenses for the service. The service coverage included North America, North Atlantic, Europe, the Middle East, Northern Pacific, Australia, and Asia. While other providers have provided in-flight internet, Connexion by Boeing accomplished it first for flights over water.

Ground stations were located in Vancouver Island, Canada; Ibaraki, Japan; Moscow, Russia; Littleton, Colorado; and Leuk, Switzerland. Two supporting data centers in Kent, Washington and Irvine, California were also used to control the service.

== First run ==
The service was first commercially demonstrated in 2003 onboard two Boeing 747-400 aircraft operated by Lufthansa and British Airways. Service was provided between Frankfurt Airport–Washington Dulles and London Heathrow–New York JFK.

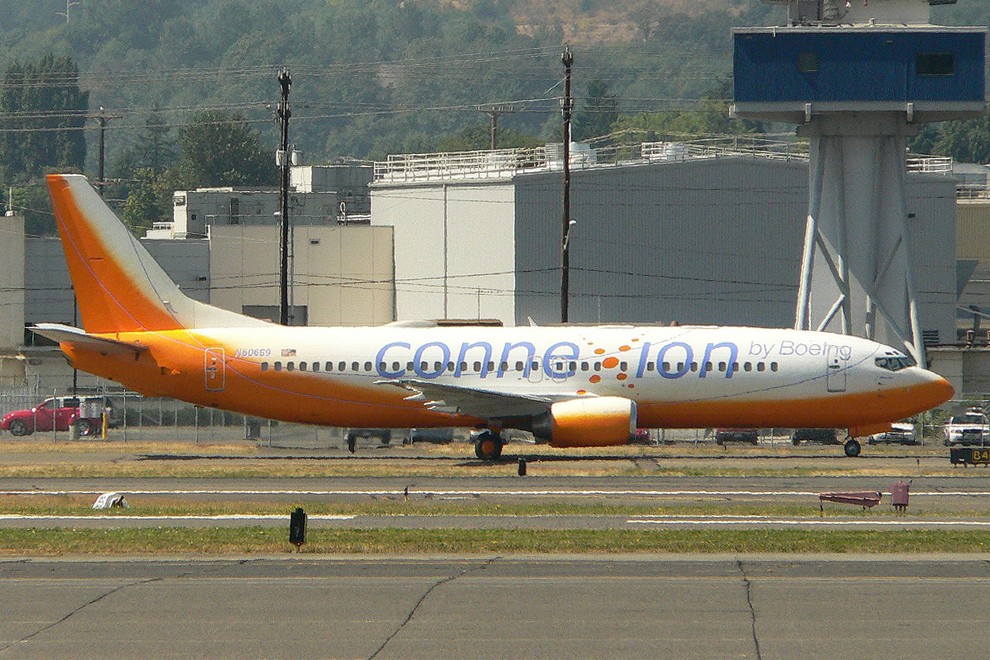
Connexion by Boeing 737 test aircraft in 2005

Connexion by Boeing was first launched as a commercial service May 17, 2004 with Lufthansa. Later in 2004, All Nippon Airways, Japan Airlines, and Scandinavian Airlines signed on to the service. Other airlines which launched Connexion by Boeing service in 2005 included China Airlines, Singapore Airlines, Asiana Airlines and Korean Air. In the later months of 2005, El-Al Israel Airlines and Etihad Airways offered the service. In 2005 Connexion by Boeing launched the first in-flight live streaming TV service on an international route on Singapore Airlines, which was expanded to all current airlines in the first quarter of 2006. The service provided four channels of live TV to each aircraft, and available TV programming varied depending on geographical location. Flying out of Germany, the service provided access to live streaming TV for CNBC (Europe), EurosportNews, BBC World, and EuroNews. MSNBC was available for flights over North America. Microsoft's Windows Media technology was used to generate the multicast TV streams, and users had to have Windows Media Player installed to watch them.

== Cost ==
Original prices varied from airline to airline, but were typically $9.95 for one hour of access, $14.95 for less than three hours of access, $19.95 for three to six hours of access, and $29.95 for unlimited access. These prices were determined by the length of the flight rather than actual or desired access time. In comparison, the typical cost at that time of unlimited dial-up internet access for an entire month was $20. Various payment options were allowed: major credit cards, mobile phone, hotspot accounts, and frequent flyer miles. In an effort to get more passengers to use the service, new pricing was announced in January 2006.

Boeing offered free service starting on October 2, 2006 as part of its plan to discontinue the service on December 31, 2006.

== Features ==
The service had a live helpdesk chat feature available for customers who had troubles with their connections. Connexion sponsored the business travel blog, InFlightHQ.

Connexion by Boeing also extended its internet service to include the maritime market in 2005. The first maritime vessels equipped with Connexion by Boeing service were provisioned in 2006.

The business unit also developed a small business jet version of its service in a partnership with Rockwell Collins.

== Expansion and dissolution ==
On January 16, 2006 Boeing also certified other companies such as Korean Air based in South Korea to carry out the Connexion by Boeing modification.

On June 26, 2006 it became public that Boeing was exploring selling or shutting down Connexion By Boeing, having failed to attract sufficient customers. The lack of sufficient customers was speculated to be a direct result of the U.S. domestic carriers pulling from agreements with Connexion after 9/11. While the European market thrived on the service, no U.S. domestic carriers were able to justify the approximate $500,000 USD per plane investment and the weight cost of the additional hardware.

On August 17, 2006, Boeing announced that it would discontinue its Connexion service, stating that, "the market for this service has not materialized as had been expected."

While the consumer service offered by CBB officially ended December 31, 2006 at midnight, Connexion's government contracts for the same service to U.S. Government planes continue under the new name of Boeing Broadband Satcom Network (BBSN).

== See also ==
- Gogo Inflight Internet
- OnAir
- AeroMobile
- Panasonic Avionics
- ASTRA2Connect Maritime Broadband
- OneWeb
- Starlink by SpaceX
- Kuiper by Amazon
