= AeroMobile =

Mobile network operator for the aviation industry

AeroMobile Communications Limited is a registered mobile network operator for the aviation industry and is based in the UK. It provides technology and services that allow the safe use of passengers' own mobile phones while inflight. A subsidiary of Panasonic Avionics Corporation its services are often installed alongside Panasonic's Wi-Fi network and can be installed either at the point of aircraft manufacture or retro-fitted across both Airbus and Boeing aircraft. Panasonic Avionic's Wi-Fi network and AeroMobile's mobile phone network are complimentary services and provide passengers with a choice of inflight connectivity options.

Since launching the service in March 2008, over 40 million passengers have connected to the network. and AeroMobile now has over 20 airline partners offering passengers inflight voice, SMS and data services on selected, connected flights. Airline partners include Emirates, Etihad, KLM, Lufthansa, SAS, Virgin Atlantic, Singapore Airlines, Cathay Pacific and Turkish Airlines.

In December 2015, AeroMobile launched the world's first 3.5G inflight mobile network with Air Berlin. The 3.5G network provides passengers with a substantial increase in data speeds, faster browsing and quicker posts.

== Company milestones ==
Date	Event	Details
September 2004	First demonstration of GSM voice and text services over Inmarsat Aero H Satcom	At World Airline Entertainment Association Congress
May 2005	First demonstration of GSM voice and text services over Inmarsat Aero H on Boeing 777	B777-200LR World Tour
November 2005	Public use of GSM voice and text service in-flight	B777-200LR world record flight
April 2006	Demonstration of GSM voice, text and GPRS services over Inmarsat Swift Broadband and Ku Band	Aircraft Interiors Expo, Hamburg
April 2007	First commercial service of in-flight voice, text and GPRS	On Qantas domestic B767
March 2008	Launch of commercial in-flight GSM service on A340	Emirates A340-300 Dubai to Casablanca
August 2008	World's first commercial in-flight GSM service on B777	Emirates B777-300 Dubai to London Heathrow
October 2008	World's first commercial in-flight GSM service on A330	Emirates A330-200
November 2008	Malaysia Airlines become the first air carrier in Asia to launch trial of in-flight GSM service	Malaysia Airlines B777-200
December 2008	50,000 passengers use the AeroMobile service	December 10 on Emirates flight number EK0923 from Dubai to Cairo
February 2009	100,000 passengers use the AeroMobile service	February 15 on Emirates flight number EK0404 from Dubai to Singapore
July 2009	AeroMobile's technology completes certification on sixth aircraft type	A340-300, A340-500, B777-200, A330-200, B777-300, B777-300ER
February 2011	5,000,000th Emirates passenger switches on their phone in-flight	Emirates flight EK0097 from Dubai to Rome
December 2011	Virgin Atlantic launch in-flight GSK service	Ten Virgin Atlantic Airbus A330 and Six B747-400 aircraft
June 2012	Gulf Air launch in-flight GSM service	Six Gulf Air A330-200 aircraft
Autumn 2012	Over 12 million unique users use AeroMobile service	
September 2012	Delivery of 1st AeroMobile line-fit from Boeing	Thai Airways B777-300ER
December 2012	First AeroMobile flight on SAS	SAS B737 Oslo to Evenes
December 2012	Etihad Airways launch "Etihad Wi-Fly" including mobile connectivity by AeroMobile	Airbus A330-200
February 2013	Kevin Rogers appointed CEO of AeroMobile	
May 2013	AeroMobile launches inflight mobile service for Air France-KLM	Two Boeing B777-300 aircraft equipped
June 2013	Etihad Airways rolls out AeroMobile connectivity on New York route	Boeing 777-300ER
September 2013	Singapore Airlines launch AeroMobile inflight mobile connectivity service	B777-300ER
October 2013	Aer Lingus launch inflight mobile services with AeroMobile	All seven of the airline's Airbus A330 aircraft
January 2014	Launch of AeroMobile connectivity on selected Qatar Airways aircraft	Selected A330-200
February 2014	Lufthansa rolls out mobile phone services with AeroMobile	Selected A330s
February 2014	Boeing delivers first B747-8 with AeroMobile connectivity	Lufthansa B747-8
June 2014	Launch of two EVA Air B777-300 aircraft with AeroMobile connectivity	Two B777-300s
February 2015	Launch of Etihad A380 with AeroMobile connectivity	Etihad A380
May 2015	Launch of AeroMobile connectivity on selected Malindo Air aircraft	Selected B737-900 aircraft
June 2015	Launch of AeroMobile connectivity on selected Alitalia aircraft	Selected A330-200 aircraft
October 2015	Launch of AeroMobile connectivity on selected Air Serbia aircraft	Selected A319 and A320 aircraft
December 2015	Launch of AeroMobile connectivity on selected Air Berlin aircraft	Launch of world's first inflight 3G network!
February 2016	Launch of AeroMobile connectivity on selected SWISS aircraft	
May 2016	Launch of AeroMobile 3G connectivity on selected Eurowings aircraft	
June 2016	Launch of AeroMobile 3G connectivity on selected Cathay Pacific aircraft	
October 2016	Singapore Airlines announce the launch of 3G A350-900	First A350 with AeroMobile connectivity
December 2016	Launch of AeroMobile connectivity on selected Turkish Airlines and Kuwait Airways aircraft	
January 2017	AeroMobile achieve the milestone of 1 Million connected flights	
January 2018	Launch of AeroMobile connectivity on selected Malaysia Airlines aircraft	

== Customers ==
- (Republic of Ireland) Aer Lingus - Launched 2013: A330-200s and A330-300s
- Air France - Launched 2013: B777
- Air Serbia - Launched 2015: A319 and A320
- (Italy) Alitalia- Launched 2015: A330-200s
- (Hong Kong) Cathay Pacific - Launched 2016: A350
- (United Arab Emirates) Emirates - Launched 2008: A330-200s, A340-300s, A340-500s, B777-200, B777-300ERs, GSM and GPRS services
- (United Arab Emirates) Etihad - Launched 2012: A330s, A380 and B777-300ERs
- (Germany) Eurowings - Launched 2016: A330
- (Taiwan) EVA Air - Launched 2014: B777
- (Netherlands) KLM - Launched 2013: B777
- Kuwait Airways - Launched 2016: B777
- Malaysia Airlines - Launched 2018: A350-900, GSM and GPRS services
- (Malaysia) Malindo Air - Launched 2015: B737-900s
- (Germany) Lufthansa - Launched 2014: A330-300s, B747-400s, B747-800s, A380-800s, A340-300s, GSM and GPRS services
- (Denmark) (Norway) (Sweden) SAS - Launched 2012: B737s GSM and GPRS (email) services
- Qatar Airways - Launched 2014: A330-200
- Singapore Airlines Launched 2013: B777-300ER
- (Switzerland) SWISS Launched 2016: B777 and A330
- (Turkey) Turkish Airlines - A330-300s, B777-300ERs, and A350-900
- (United Kingdom) Virgin Atlantic - Launched 2011: A330, B747-400 GSM and GPRS services

== See also ==
- Aircell
- Connexion by Boeing
- Inmarsat
- Mobile phones on aircraft
- OnAir
