= SITAONAIR =

In-flight telecommunications company

- Type: Private
- Industry: Telecommunications, Aviation
- Predecessor: OnAir
- Headquarters: Geneva, Switzerland
- Area served: Worldwide
- Parent: SITA
- Website: www.sitaonair.aero

SITAONAIR is an in-flight telecommunications company that provides onboard connectivity services enabling airline passengers to use personal devices for services such as mobile messaging and internet access, and (where permitted) mobile voice calls.

== History ==
The business was established in 2005 as OnAir, a joint venture between SITA and Airbus, created to develop and market passenger connectivity services including GSM and internet access on aircraft. In 2013, Airbus exited the venture by selling its remaining stake to SITA, making OnAir a wholly owned SITA subsidiary. In 2015, SITA and OnAir announced a combined organization branded SITA OnAir (stylised SITAONAIR) focused on connected-aircraft solutions for airlines.

== Services ==
SITAONAIR provides aircraft connectivity services for both passenger communications and airline operational use.

=== Passenger connectivity ===
OnAir-branded services have included:

- Internet OnAir, providing onboard internet access for passengers using their own devices.
- Mobile OnAir, providing onboard GSM-based connectivity for mobile devices (for services such as messaging and mobile data, and in some cases voice calls).

Airlines may choose to restrict onboard voice calls while still allowing messaging and data services.

=== Aircraft and airline operations ===
In addition to passenger services, SITAONAIR has offered aircraft communications and data services intended to support airline operations, including cockpit and air traffic management-related connectivity and infrastructure solutions.

== Technology ==
OnAir's passenger connectivity services have used satellite connectivity, including Inmarsat SwiftBroadband, and OnAir was selected by Inmarsat as a distribution partner for its Global Xpress service.

== See also ==
- Gogo Inflight Internet
- Connexion by Boeing
- AeroMobile
- SwiftBroadband
