= Bee Movie =

2007 DreamWorks Animation film

- Theatrical release poster
- Directed by: Simon J. Smith; Steve Hickner
- Written by: Jerry Seinfeld; Spike Feresten; Barry Marder; Andy Robin
- Produced by: Jerry Seinfeld; Christina Steinberg
- Starring: Jerry Seinfeld; Renée Zellweger
- Edited by: Nick Fletcher
- Music by: Rupert Gregson-Williams
- Production companies: DreamWorks Animation; Columbus 81 Productions
- Distributed by: Paramount Pictures (Note: In July 2014, the film's distribution rights were purchased by DreamWorks Animation from Paramount Pictures and transferred to 20th Century Fox before reverting to Universal Pictures in 2018 following NBCUniversal's acquisition of DreamWorks Animation in 2016.)
- Release dates: October 25, 2007 (New York City); November 2, 2007 (United States)
- Running time: 90 minutes
- Country: United States
- Language: English
- Budget: $150 million
- Box office: $293.5 million

Bee Movie is a 2007 American animated satirical comedy film directed by Simon J. Smith and Steve Hickner, and written by Jerry Seinfeld, Spike Feresten, Barry Marder, and Andy Robin. Produced by DreamWorks Animation, it stars Seinfeld and Renée Zellweger. The film centers on Barry B. Benson (Seinfeld), an anthropomorphic honey bee who tries to sue the human race for exploiting bees after learning from his new florist friend Vanessa Bloome (Zellweger) that humans sell and consume honey.

Bee Movie premiered in New York City on October 25, 2007, and was released in theaters in the United States on November 2 by Paramount Pictures. The film grossed $293.5 million worldwide on a budget of $150 million, and received mixed reviews from critics, who praised its humor and voice cast but criticized its plot and screenplay. It has gained a cult following since its release, partly driven by internet memes of the film shared on social media, which lampoon its surreal premise, script and celebrity cameos.

== Plot ==
Barry B. Benson, an idealistic honey bee graduate who can talk to humans, is about to enter the hive's honey-making workforce, Honex Industries, with his best friend, Adam Flayman. Barry is initially excited, but his ambitious, insubordinate attitude emerges upon discovering that his choice of job will never change once picked. Later, the two bees run into a group of Pollen Jocks, bees who collect pollen from flowers outside the hive, and they offer to take Barry with them if he is "bee enough". While on his first pollen-gathering expedition in Manhattan, Barry gets lost in the rain, and ends up in the apartment of a human florist named Vanessa Bloome. Upon noticing Barry, Vanessa's boyfriend Ken attempts to kill him, but Vanessa gently catches and releases Barry outside, saving his life.

Barry later returns to express his gratitude to Vanessa, breaking the sacred law that bees are not to communicate with humans. Barry and Vanessa develop a close friendship, bordering on attraction, and spend time together. When he and Vanessa are in a grocery store, Barry discovers that the humans have been stealing and eating the bees' honey for centuries. He decides to journey to Honey Farms, which supplies the grocery store with its honey. Incredulous at the poor treatment of the bees in the hives, including the use of bee smokers to incapacitate colonies, Barry decides to sue the human race to put an end to exploitation of the bees, with Vanessa agreeing to help.

Barry's mission attracts wide attention from bees and humans alike, with countless spectators attending the trial. Although Barry is up against tough defense attorney Layton T. Montgomery, the trial's first day goes well. That evening, Barry is having dinner with Vanessa when Ken shows up. Vanessa leaves the room, and Ken expresses to Barry that he hates the pair spending time together. When Barry leaves to use the restroom, Ken ambushes and attempts to murder him, only for Vanessa to intervene and break up with Ken. The second day at the trial, Montgomery unleashes an unrepentant character assassination against the bees, leading a deeply offended Adam to sting him. Montgomery immediately exaggerates the stinging to make himself seem the victim of an assault while simultaneously tarnishing Adam. Adam's actions jeopardize the bees' credibility and his life, though he recovers in a hospital with a small, plastic sword as a replacement stinger. The third day, Barry wins the trial by exposing the jury to the torturous treatment of bees, preventing humans from stealing honey from bees ever again. Having lost the trial, Montgomery cryptically warns Barry that a negative shift of nature is imminent.

Human-obtained honey being returned in overload to the hives leads to Honex stopping honey production and all bees, including the vitally important Pollen Jocks, put out of a job, and all the world's flowers begin to die out without any pollination. Before long, the last remaining flowers on Earth are being stockpiled in Pasadena, California, intended for the last Tournament of Roses Parade. Barry and Vanessa travel to the parade and steal a float, which they load onto a plane. They hope to bring the flowers to the bees so they can re-pollinate the world's last remaining flowers. When the plane's captain explains that the flight will be delayed due to bad weather, Barry attempts to talk to the pilots, only for them to knock each other out while attempting to kill Barry. With help from Barry and the bees from Barry's hive, Vanessa lands the plane safely.

Barry becomes a member of the Pollen Jocks, and they fly off to a flower patch. Armed with the pollen of the last flowers, Barry and the Pollen Jocks reverse the damage and save the world's plants, restarting the bees' honey production. Later on, Barry runs a law firm at Vanessa's flower shop titled "Insects at Law", which handles disputes between animals and humans. While selling flowers to customers, Vanessa offers certain brands of honey that are "bee-approved".

== Voice cast ==
- Jerry Seinfeld as Barry B. Benson
- Renée Zellweger as Vanessa Bloome
- Matthew Broderick as Adam Flayman
- John Goodman as Layton T. Montgomery
- Patrick Warburton as Ken
- Barry Levinson as Martin B. Benson, Barry's father
- Kathy Bates as Janet B. Benson, Barry's mother
- Rip Torn as Pollen Jocks General Lou Lo Duca
- Chris Rock as Mooseblood the Mosquito
- Megan Mullally as Trudy, Honex Tour Guide
- Larry King as Bee Larry King, a fictionalized bee version of himself
- Oprah Winfrey as Judge Bumbleton
- Ray Liotta as Himself
- Sting as Himself
- Michael Richards as Bud Ditchwater
- Jim Cummings as Title Narrator and Graduation Announcer
- Larry Miller as Dean Buzzwell
- David Moses Pimentel as Hector
- Chuck Martin as Andy
- Brian Hopkins as Sandy Shrimpkin and TSA Agent
- John DiMaggio as Bailiff and Janitor
- Tress MacNeille as Jeanette Chung, Mother and Cow
- Simon J. Smith as Truck Driver and Chet
- Robert Jayne as Bee (only credited with ADR Group)
- Carl Kasell as Himself (uncredited)

== Production ==
The development of Bee Movie began in 2003, when Steven Spielberg approached DreamWorks Animation CEO and co-founder Jeffrey Katzenberg after Jerry Seinfeld asked him to make an animated film featuring insects. Seinfeld spent a week in Los Angeles working on it. Teleconferencing system HP Halo was installed in Seinfeld's office in New York, enabling him to work on the film and interact between coasts. Seinfeld said he set the film in New York because it was "the Tigris and Euphrates of comedy", and Katzenberg was the main reason for making the film. The budget was approximately $150 million. Spielberg appeared in two live-action trailers for this film in November 2006 and early 2007 where he interacted with Seinfeld, who wore a bee costume. Using these trailers as a basis, promotional live-action short skits surrounding the production of the movie, branded as Bee Movie TV Juniors, would air on NBC during their Fall primetime lineup.

== Release ==
Bee Movie debuted in New York City on October 25, 2007, followed by a premiere on October 28, in Los Angeles. It was released in the United States on November 2. The film was produced by DreamWorks Animation and Columbus 81 Productions, and distributed by Paramount Pictures. Bee Movie Game was released in October 2007 on multiple platforms.

Brach's sold Bee Movie candy corn, made with real honey, and also held a sweepstakes with the grand prize being a trip for four to New York City. General Mills placed cereal spoons and hand buzzers inside cereal boxes promoting Bee Movie. Customers could save 50 cents if they bought two Fruit by the Foot, Fruit Gushers, and Fruit Roll-Ups products featuring Bee Movie on their packaging. McDonald's offered six Bee Movie toys in its Happy Meals, while the company's advertising pointed customers towards white meat chicken nuggets, apple dippers, and low-fat milk. The Happy Meal and Conservation International websites both invited kids to take the "Bee Good to the Planet" pledge to protect the environment, and McDonald's supported Conservation International's efforts to protect bee habitats in South Africa and Mexico.

Paramount Home Entertainment released Bee Movie on DVD (single- and double-disc) on March 11, 2008, and on Blu-ray on May 20. The DVD extras include the "Inside the Hive: The Cast of Bee Movie" and "Tech of Bee Movie" featurettes, "We Got the Bee" music video, "Meet Barry B. Benson" feature, interactive games, a filmmaker commentary, alternate endings, lost scenes, the live-action trailers, and Jerry's Flight Over Cannes. An HD DVD version of the film was canceled after the discontinuation of that format. The DVD release of Bee Movie was promoted with a $3 mail-in rebate offer from Blue Diamond Growers and a coupon for $1 off Sue Bee honey products.

== Reception ==
=== Box office ===
Bee Movie earned $126.6 million in the United States and Canada and $166.9 million in other countries, for a worldwide total of $293.5 million. DreamWorks Animation reported that the film made $27.3 million in home media revenues.

The film was released with American Gangster and Martian Child on November 2, 2007. Bee Movie earned $10.2 million on its first day. The film debuted at second earning $39.1 million from 3,928 theaters. Its second weekend earnings dropped by 32% to $26 million, and followed by another $14.3 million the third weekend. Bee Movie completed its theatrical run in the United States and Canada on February 14, 2008.

=== Critical reception ===
Bee Movie has an approval rating of 49% based on 168 professional reviews on the review aggregator website Rotten Tomatoes, with an average rating of 5.8/10. Its critical consensus reads, "Bee Movie has humorous moments, but its awkward premise and tame delivery render it mostly forgettable." Metacritic (which uses a weighted average) assigned Bee Movie a score of 54 out of 100 based on 34 critics, indicating "mixed or average" reviews. Audiences polled by CinemaScore gave the film an average grade of "B+" on an A+ to F scale.

Michael Phillips of the Chicago Tribune gave the film two and a half stars out of four, saying "It's on the easygoing level of Surf's Up, and a full tick up from, say, Over the Hedge or The Ant Bully. But given the Seinfeld pedigree it's something of a disappointment." Peter Travers of Rolling Stone gave the film three out of four stars, saying "At its relaxed best, when it's about, well, nothing, the slyly comic Bee Movie is truly beguiling." Desson Thomson of The Washington Post said, "Bee Movie feels phoned in on every level. The images, usually computer animation's biggest draw, are disappointingly average. And as for the funny stuff, well, that's where you were supposed to come in."

A. O. Scott of The New York Times gave the film three and a half stars out of four, saying "The most genuinely apian aspect of Bee Movie is that it spends a lot of its running time buzzing happily around, sniffing out fresh jokes wherever they may bloom." Claudia Puig gave the film one and a half stars out of four, saying "Bee Movie is certainly not low-budget, but it has all the staying power and creative value of a B-movie. The secret life of bees, as told by Seinfeld, is a bore with a capital B." Steven Rea of The Philadelphia Inquirer gave the film three stars out of four, saying "Bee Movie is not Shrek, and it is not Ratatouille either (by far the standout computer-animated feature of the year). But it has enough buzzing wit and eye-popping animation to win over the kids—and probably more than a few parents, too." Richard Roeper gave the film a positive review, saying "This is a beautifully animated, cleverly executed, warm and funny adventure."

Roger Ebert gave the film two out of four stars, saying "All of this material, written by Seinfeld and writers associated with his television series, tries hard, but never really takes off. We learn at the outset of the movie that bees theoretically cannot fly. Unfortunately, in the movie, that applies only to the screenplay. It is really, really, really hard to care much about a platonic romantic relationship between Renee Zellweger and a bee, although if anyone could pull it off, she could." Ty Burr of The Boston Globe gave the film three out of four stars, saying "The vibe is loose-limbed and fluky, and the gags have an extra snap that's recognizably Seinfeldian. If I believed in a sitcom afterlife, I'd swear the whole thing was cooked up by Kramer and George's dad."

=== Accolades ===
Bee Movie led the 35th Annie Awards season with five nominations (including Best Animated Feature). At the 65th Golden Globe Awards, it was nominated for Best Animated Feature Film. The 13th Critics' Choice Awards nominated the film for Best Animated Feature.

Award	Date of ceremony	Category	Recipients	Result
Annie Awards	February 8, 2008	Best Animated Feature	Bee Movie	Nominated
Annie Awards	February 8, 2008	Animation Production Artist	Michael Isaak	Nominated
Annie Awards	February 8, 2008	Storyboarding In A Feature Production	Nassos Vakalis	Nominated
Annie Awards	February 8, 2008	Voice Acting in an Animated Feature Production	Patrick Warburton	Nominated
Annie Awards	February 8, 2008	Music in an Animated Feature Production	Rupert Gregson-Williams	Nominated
Critics Choice Awards	January 7, 2008	Best Animated Feature	Steve Hickner and Simon J. Smith	Nominated
Golden Globe Awards	January 13, 2008	Best Animated Film	Simon J. Smith and Steve Hickner	Nominated
Golden Reel Award	2008	Golden Reel Award for Outstanding Achievement in Sound Editing – Sound Effects, Foley, Dialogue and ADR for Animated Feature Film	Will Files (supervising sound editor/sound designer); Michael Silvers (supervising sound editor); Randy Thom (sound designer); Luke Dunn Gielmuda (supervising Foley editor); J.J. George (supervising music editor); Scott Guitteau, Kyrsten Mate (sound editors); Steve Slanec (ADR editor), Kevin Crehan (music editor)	Nominated
Producers Guild of America Awards	February 2, 2008	Best Animated Motion Picture	Jerry Seinfeld, Christina Steinberg, and Cameron Stevning	Nominated
Kids' Choice Awards	March 29, 2008	Favorite Animated Movie	Bee Movie	Nominated
Kids' Choice Awards	March 29, 2008	Favorite Voice From an Animated Movie	Jerry Seinfeld as Barry B. Benson	Nominated

== Lawsuits ==
Two lawsuits involving Bee Movie were filed. Multiple Swedish animation students, who were represented by an American attorney, sued because their developed concept in 2000, titled Beebylon, had similarities to Bee Movie. A separate suit was brought by Florida-based cosmetics company Beeceuticals over the use of their trademarked phrase "Give Bees a Chance". Both of these lawsuits were settled.

== Legacy ==
Years after the film's release, Bee Movie has seen an unexpected rise in popularity as an absurd and surreal Internet meme. In 2015, posts of the film's dialog transcript (erroneously called the "script") spread across Facebook. On November 17, 2016, YouTube user Avoid at All Costs uploaded a video titled "The entire bee movie but every time they say bee it gets faster", where the entire film is sped up every time the word "bee" is spoken, condensing the film to only 7 minutes; the video amassed twelve million views.

Vanity Fair later characterized the film's sudden popularity as "totally bizarre", and later identified Jason Richards as one of the meme's larger promoters through his @Seinfeld2000 Twitter account. Inverse felt the film's ironic internet popularity has helped the movie become critically reevaluated by millennial critics who now view the film as an unironic, genuinely well-made film.

Seinfeld has commented on the film's reemergence as a meme as "kinda weird but pretty welcoming" and said "you just can't predict what the internet will do next, but you gotta love it", but expressed no interest in making a sequel to Bee Movie despite its online popularity.
