= Fruit by the Foot =

Fruit-based snack made by General Mills

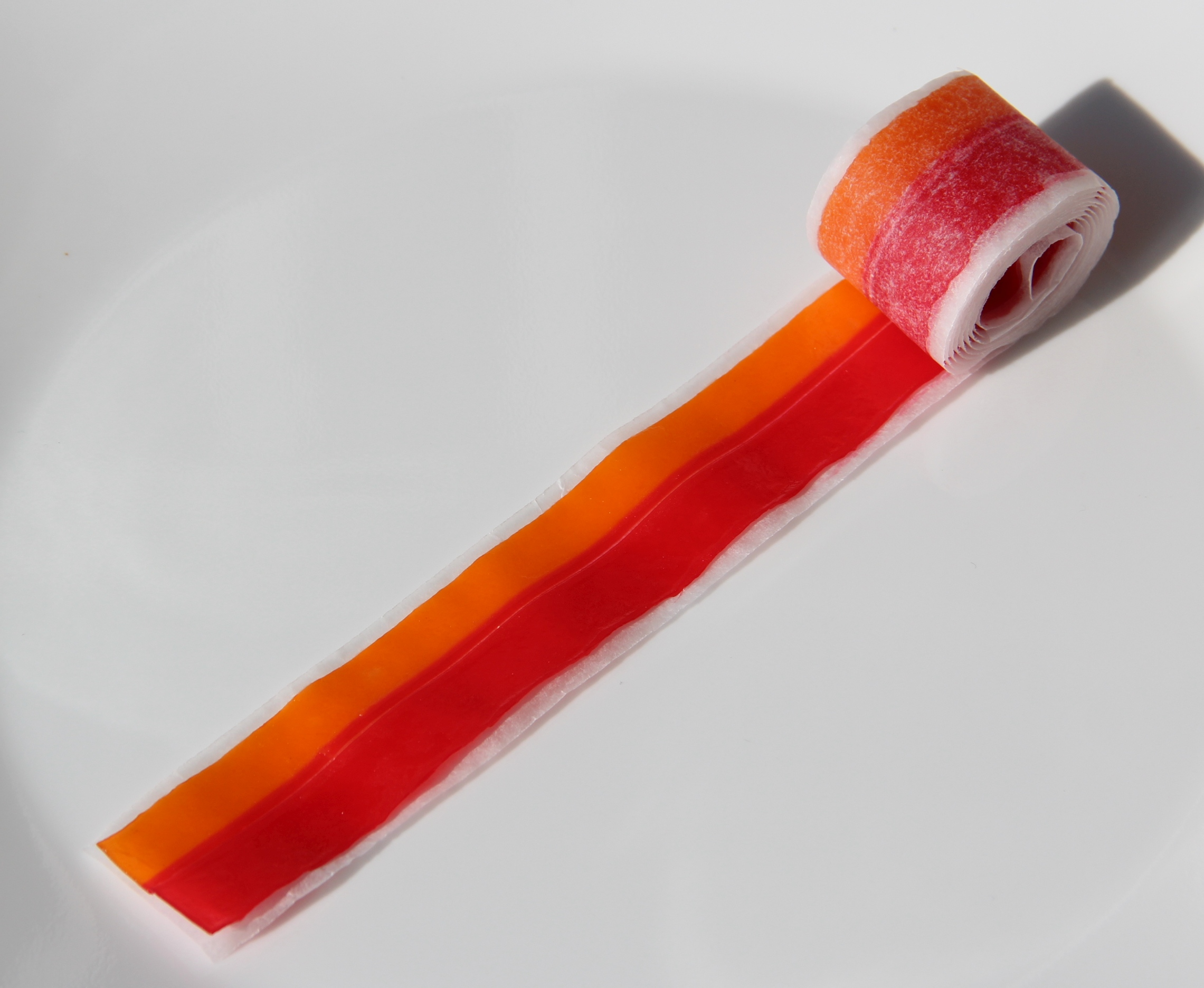
Fruit by the Foot orange and cherry flavor

Fruit by the Foot is a fruit snack made by General Mills and distributed under the Betty Crocker brand. It was introduced in 1991 in North America. A similar product, Fruit Winders (previously Real Fruit Winders and Screamin' Fruit Winders), was released by Kellanova in the United Kingdom and Ireland. In August 2023, Fruit by the Foot had a rebrand, which included new packaging and logo.

== Ingredients ==
Fruit by the Foot's primary ingredients are sugar, maltodextrin, corn syrup, pear puree concentrate, and palm oil. It used to contain artificial flavors; however, they have switched to pear puree and natural flavors in recent years. It also contains sour-tasting ingredients such as malic acid, citric acid, and sodium citrate. It contains a number of other ingredients including stabilizers, emulsifiers, preservatives, and either artificial colors or naturally-derived food colors. In 2012, it contained hydrogenated cottonseed oil (instead of palm oil).

== Promotions ==
The paper backing is occasionally printed with games, jokes, or trivia facts. In the early 1990s, Fruit by the Foot came with stickers as a marketing prize. Children would often place these stickers on their lunch boxes to prove they had eaten Fruit by the Foot.

In early 1999, Nintendo and General Mills worked together on a promotional television advertising campaign costing $5 million. The advertisement by Saatchi began on January 25 with Fruit by the Foot snacks including tips on various Nintendo 64 games on the wax paper. Ninety different tips were available, with three variations of thirty tips each.

== See also ==
- Fruit Roll-Ups, a similar product that originated in the 1980s
- Fruit Gushers, a similar product that debuted the same year as Fruit by the Foot
