= Ford Taurus (first generation) =

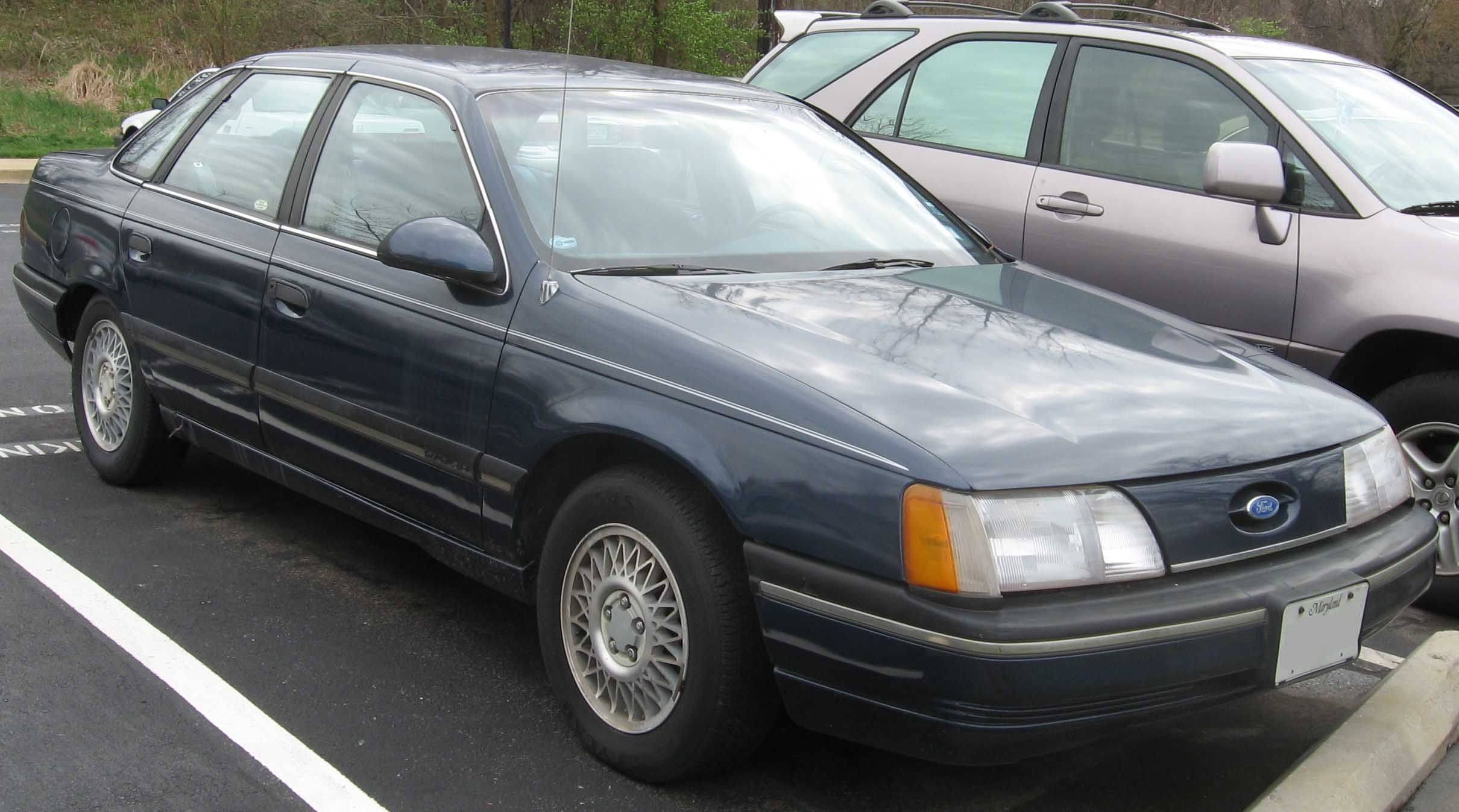

Overview
- Manufacturer: Ford
- Production: October 1985– July 1991
- Model years: 1986–1991
- Assembly: Atlanta Assembly, Hapeville, Georgia, United States; Chicago Assembly, Chicago, Illinois, United States
- Designer: Jack Telnack (design chief: 1980–84); Ray Everts (sedan exterior: 1982); Jeff Teague (wagon exterior: 1982)

Body and chassis
- Class: Mid-size car
- Body style: 4-door sedan 5-door station wagon
- Layout: FF Layout
- Platform: Ford DN5 platform
- Related: Mercury Sable; Ford Taurus SHO; Lincoln Continental

Powertrain
- Engine: 2.5 L HSC I4; 3.0 L Vulcan V6; 3.8 L Essex V6
- Transmission: 3-speed ATX automatic 4-speed AXOD automatic 4-speed AXOD-E automatic 5-speed MTX manual

Dimensions
- Wheelbase: 106.0 in (2,692 mm)
- Length: 188.4 in (4,785 mm); Station wagon: 191.9 in (4,874 mm)
- Width: 70.8 in (1,798 mm)
- Height: Sedan: 54.3 in (1,379 mm); Wagon: 55.1 in (1,400 mm)
- Curb weight: 3,050 lb (1,380 kg)

Chronology
- Predecessor: Ford LTD
- Successor: Ford Taurus (second generation)

The first-generation Ford Taurus and Mercury Sable are automobiles produced by Ford as the first of six generations of the Ford Taurus and Mercury Sable. Launched on December 26, 1985, as a 1986 model, the front-wheel-drive Taurus was a very influential design that is credited with saving Ford from bankruptcy, bringing many innovations to the marketplace and starting the trend towards aerodynamic design for the American automakers in the North American market. Ford of Europe had launched the 1980s move to aerodynamic design for the company with the 1982 Ford Sierra.

Development for the first-generation Taurus started in the early 1980s to replace the Ford LTD, at the cost of 3 billion dollars, with a team led by the vice president in charge of car development Lewis Veraldi dubbed "Team Taurus." Ford was suffering from a lackluster product line from the late 1970s to the early 1980s, and then-chairman Philip Caldwell staked much of the finances and future of the company on Veraldi and his team's success, giving them unprecedented leeway in developing what would become the Taurus. The Taurus' development employed a strategy of teamwork and customer communication that would prove very influential for the automotive industry, as it consolidated all of Ford's designers, engineers, and marketing staff into a group who worked on the car collectively. The Taurus' development was initially kept very secret by Ford, and not much was revealed about the final Taurus until it was unveiled in 1985.

After its release, the Taurus became a strong seller, as over 200,000 would be sold in the 1986 model year, and over a million were sold by 1989. This generation of Taurus garnered additional sales by its two variants: a Mercury version entitled the Sable, and a high-performance version entitled the SHO, and its engine and drivetrain would be used on the 1988 Lincoln Continental. This generation of Taurus continued with only minor changes until it was replaced in 1991 by the second-generation Ford Taurus. When production ended in 1991, more than 2,000,000 first-generation Tauruses had been sold.

== Development and release ==
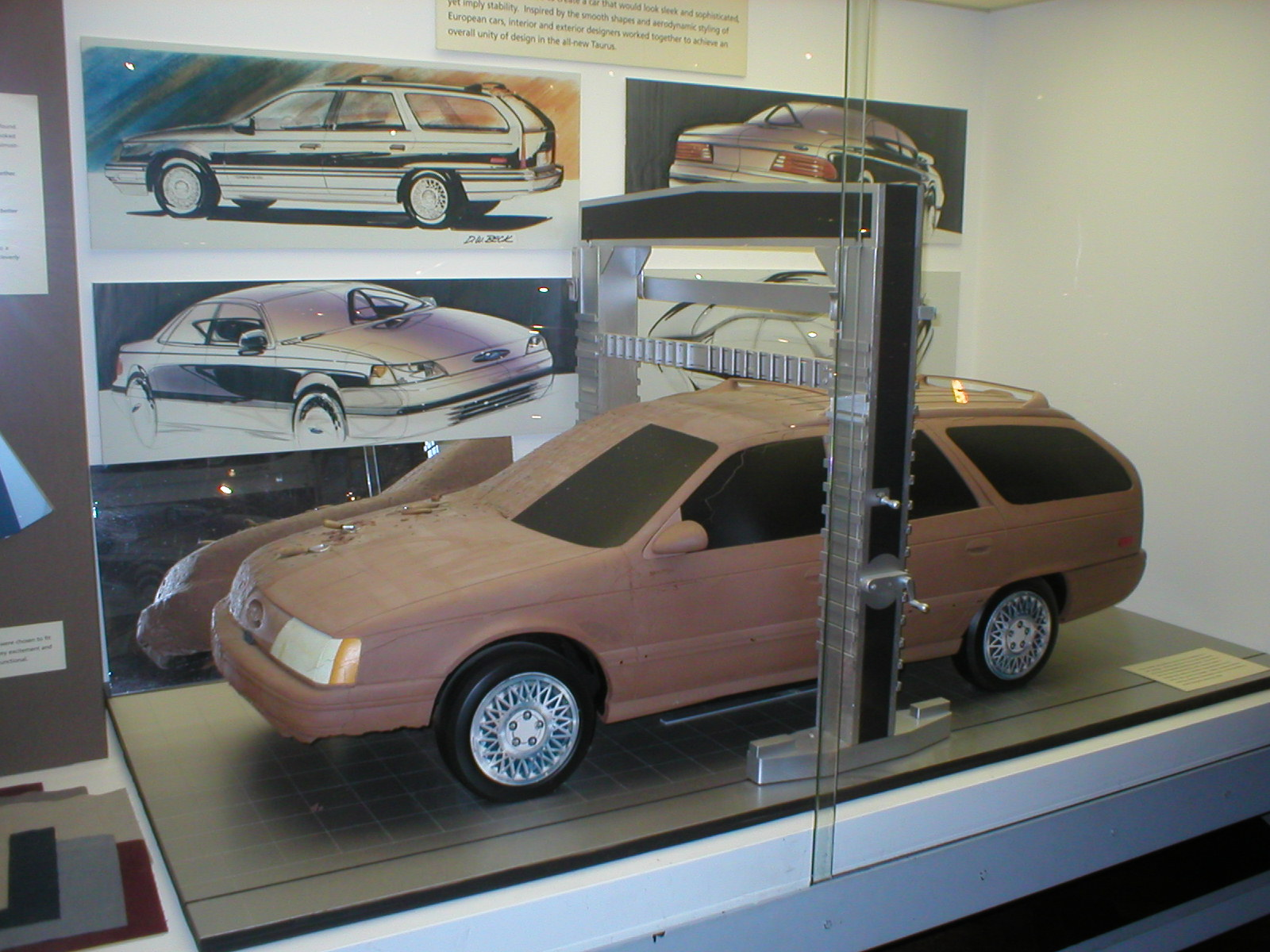
1983 Taurus wagon clay model along with many of the original design sketches.

When Ford set out to develop the Taurus, they employed a teamwork strategy that would be revolutionary in the car development process. Previously, at both Ford and General Motors, interior and exterior designers worked separately with no input from each other or from engineers. As a result, the interiors and exteriors of many American cars seemed "mismatched." Taurus development started in the spring of 1980 upon Ford executive board approval, using a method similar to that Ford used when developing the Escort, in which engineers from all Ford branches worldwide worked together. Unlike the Escort, though, the Taurus was developed entirely by American engineers at Ford's headquarters. The new engineering team was assembled by designer Jack Telnack, and was dubbed "Team Taurus." Under Telnack, responsible for the sedan exterior was Ray Everts and wagon exterior was Jeff Teague.

The Taurus went through many revisions throughout its development. Original prototypes contained a full glass roof similar to that of the Subaru SVX, though it was deemed "too radical" and abandoned. Applying lessons learned from the Edsel, customer input played an instrumental role in the Taurus' development, as many components, including radios, steering wheels, seats, wheels, and entire suspension setups were selected by large numbers of average people through a series of surveys conducted by Ford. In addition, Ford disassembled many competing cars such as the Toyota Camry, the Honda Accord, and the more luxurious BMW 5 Series in order to examine their parts and components.

Ford resoundingly premiered the Taurus. In mid-1985, Ford gathered executives and the press for the unveiling of the Taurus and Mercury Sable. The event took place at the MGM Studios Soundstage 85, where Gone with the Wind had been filmed. The studio was decorated in a space theme, with stars on the walls, flying saucer decorations, and refreshments served in flying saucer-shaped coolers. For the unveiling, "space" music started playing, as projected stars floated around the room in dance floor fashion. The outlines of the cars glowed green through the curtain; as the curtain flew up, strobe lights flashed, highlighting the cars.

Many industry journalists, as well as executives at Ford and Chrysler, believed the Taurus was going to be a failure. Chrysler executives believed customers would instead embrace their more conventional Dodge Dynasty and Chrysler New Yorker, which were still in development at the time. Executives at Ford knew producing the Taurus was a gamble, as they ran the risk of the car being so advanced it would turn off potential customers, as was the case with the Edsel. As a result, Ford continued to produce the LTD, which the Taurus was designed to replace in 1986. If the Taurus failed, Ford would have to file for Chapter 11 bankruptcy. The Taurus, however, ended up being a resounding success, selling over a million units in its first generation alone.

=== Reception ===
After being unveiled in 1985, the Taurus quickly became one of the most anticipated new cars of 1986. Before going on sale, Motor Trend tested a few Taurus prototypes, and praised the cars extensively, even calling them "the shape of tomorrow." Popular Mechanics also tested pre-production Tauruses, and praised them as well, describing them as a "totally new breed of car." When the Taurus was released in 1985, it garnered unanimous critical praise from automotive publications. It went on to win many awards, most notably being named Motor Trend's Car of the Year for 1986, as well as being named on Car and Driver's Ten Best List for 1986.

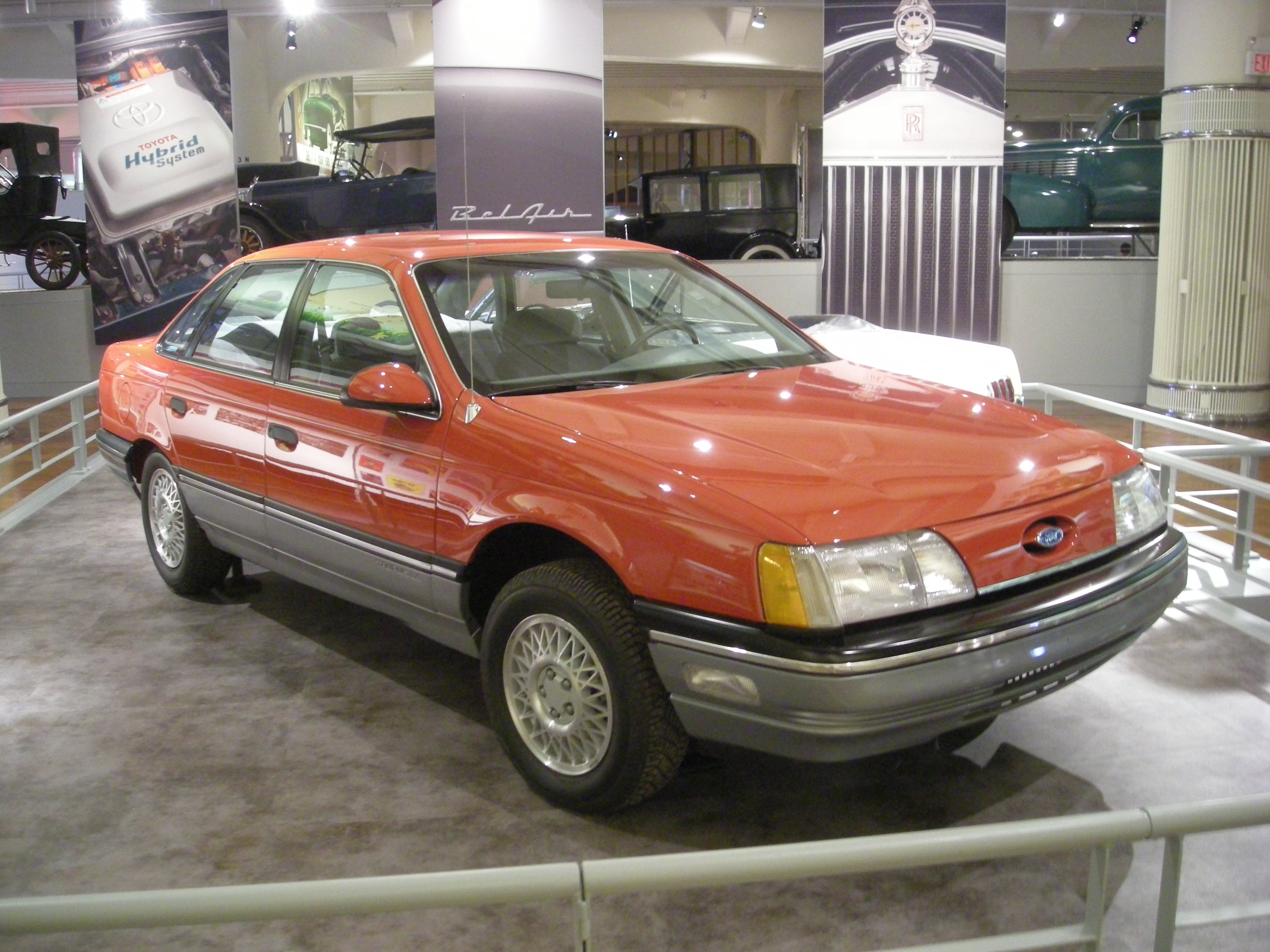
The 1986 Taurus LX used by Motor Trend for their 1986 Car of the Year testing on display at the Henry Ford Museum's Showroom of Automotive History exhibit

It was also received very well by the public, as over 200,000 Tauruses were sold for the 1986 model year. Its radical design was also noticed by the film industry, which began using modified Taurus models in future-themed films, such as Back to the Future Part II. Most notably, the Taurus was prominently featured in the 1987 action film RoboCop, where modified 1986 LX sedans are used as police vehicles driven by the titular character; one of the Taurus sedans used in filming is on display at the Branson Auto Museum in Branson, Missouri. In 1989, the millionth Taurus was sold after three years in production.

The 1986 Taurus continues to receive positive press, recognizing its lasting influence on the automobile industry. It was number 6 on USA Today's 2007 list of "25 Cars That Made a Difference", and was named a "Future Classic" by Autoblog. The 1986 Taurus tested by Motor Trend is currently featured in the Henry Ford Museum's Showroom of Automotive History exhibit, in which it is touted as "one of the two most significant American automobiles of the 1980s", the other being the Chrysler minivan.

In 1988, the Taurus was exported to Japan in limited numbers and sold at Japanese auto dealerships called Autorama (a joint venture with Mazda), where the Taurus LX and the SHO were available in both sedan and wagon versions with left-hand driving positions until 1991. To Japanese buyers, it was regarded as a luxury vehicle as the exterior dimensions and engine displacement exceeded Japanese government regulations, and buyers in Japan were liable for additional taxes. The engines offered to Japanese customers, both the 2.5 liter four cylinder and the 3.0 liter V6, also obligated Japanese drivers to pay more annual road tax, which affected sales.

== Design ==
=== Exterior ===
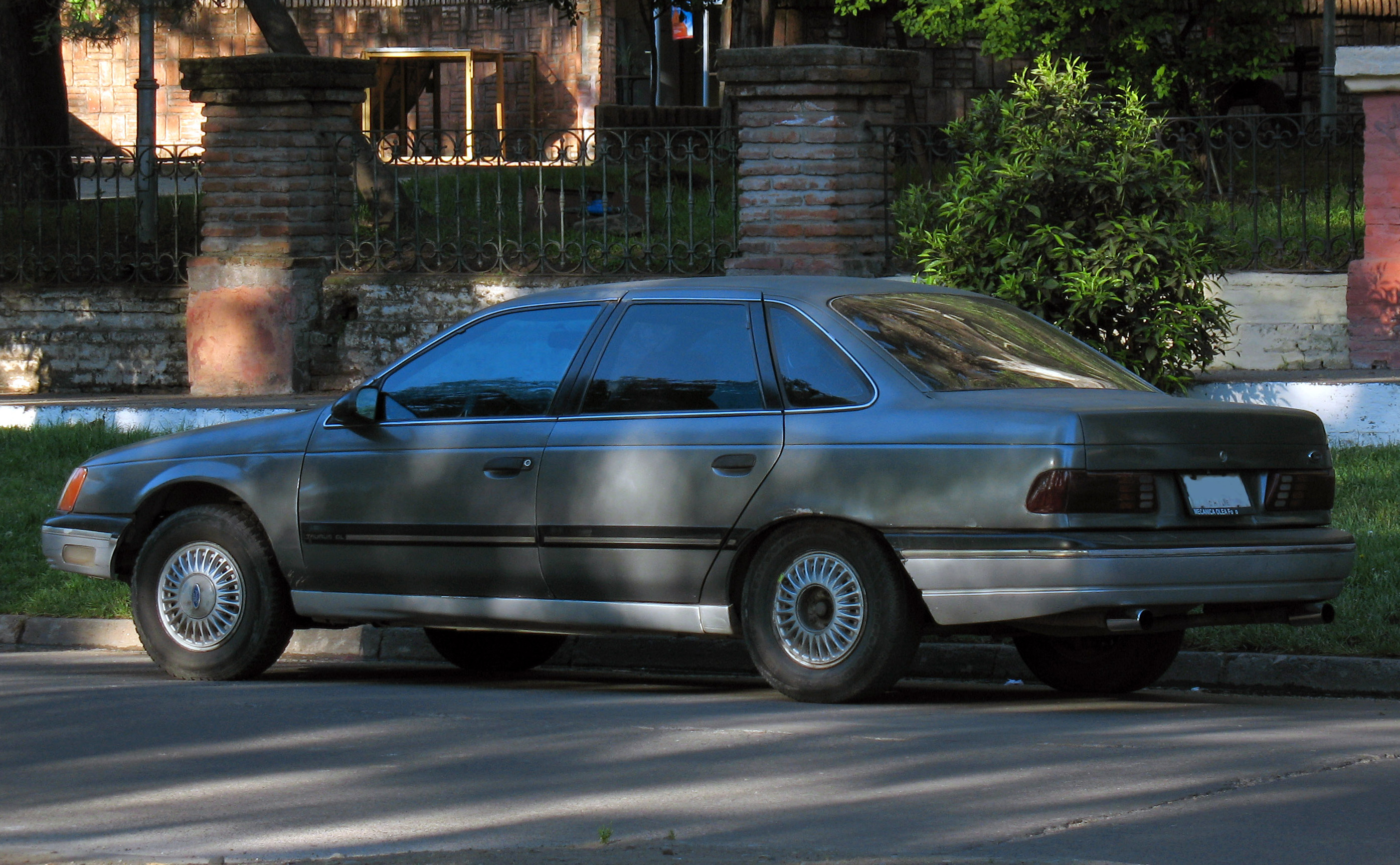
1986–1989 Ford Taurus GL

The exterior of the Taurus used an aerodynamic design, often likened to a 'jelly bean' or 'flying potato,' inspired by the design of the Audi 100 and Ford's own Tempo. The aerodynamic design of the Taurus also made the car more fuel efficient, allowing Ford to meet the more stringent Corporate Average Fuel Economy (CAFE) standards applied by the United States government. The Taurus' success ultimately led to an American automobile design revolution; Chrysler and General Motors developed aerodynamic cars in order to capitalize on the Taurus' success.

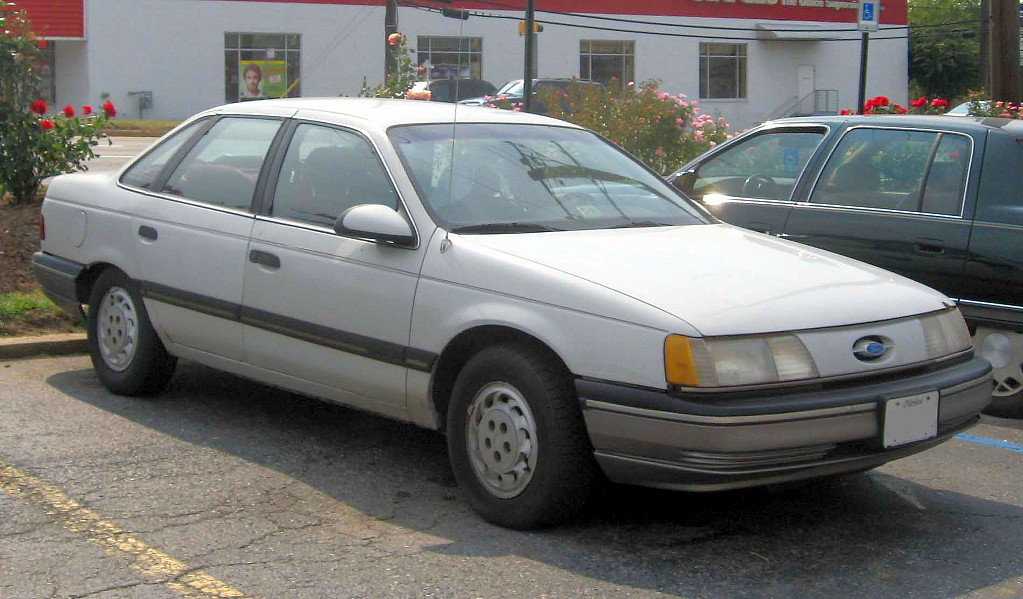
1989–1991 Ford Taurus. Note the changes to the front end.

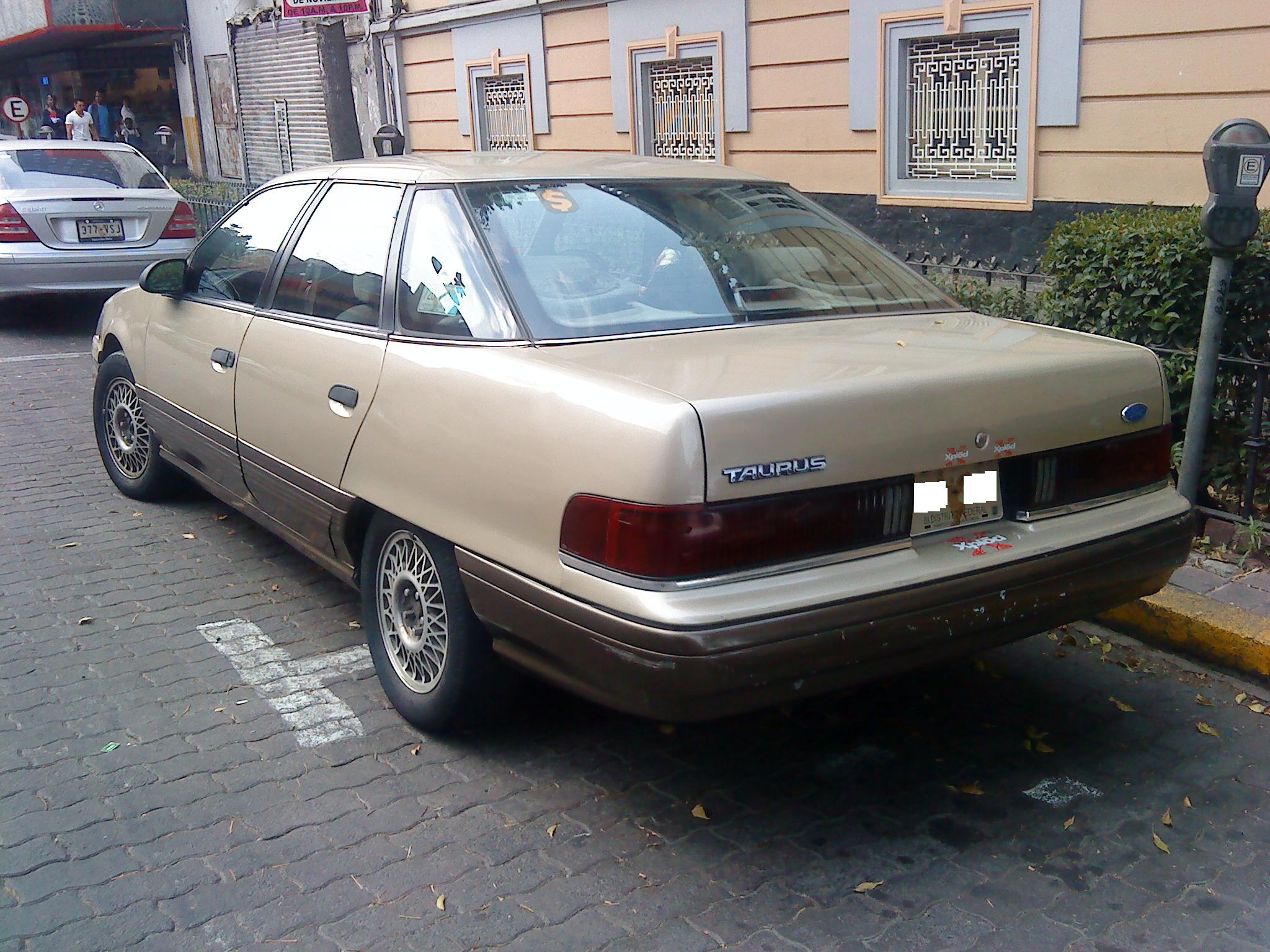
In Mexico, the Mercury Sable was sold as the Taurus.

The Taurus is credited with bringing many new design features into the mainstream marketplace. The Taurus used flush aerodynamic composite headlights and was one of the first American sedans to do so. Originally, the U.S. National Highway Traffic Safety Administration (NHTSA) required that all cars sold in the United States use standardized round or rectangular sealed beam headlights. Ford had to convince them to change the rule to allow the headlights be any shape, as long as they met federal lighting standards.

Also, instead of a grille, the Taurus had a front panel to adopt a grille-less 'bottom breather' nose, first pioneered by the Citroën DS in the 1950s. The Taurus' doors flowed up into the roof, designed to make the interior airtight, and had the door handles and windows flush with the rest of the car. The bumpers on the Taurus were designed to also be incorporated with the rest of the car's design, being flush with the rest of the body. The wheels were also pushed out to the ends of the frame, and were flush with the fender, instead of being recessed into the fender. This not only improved the car's aerodynamics, but it also improved handling as well.

These design features helped to make the Taurus one of the most aerodynamic cars of its time, with an aerodynamic drag ratio of 0.32. Many of the design features were adopted, and are still used today, on most cars. Because of this, the exterior only received minor changes throughout the first-generation's production run. The only major change came in 1988, when the Taurus received a new slimmer grille and headlights, with a full-length chrome bar underneath for the 1989 model year.

=== Interior ===
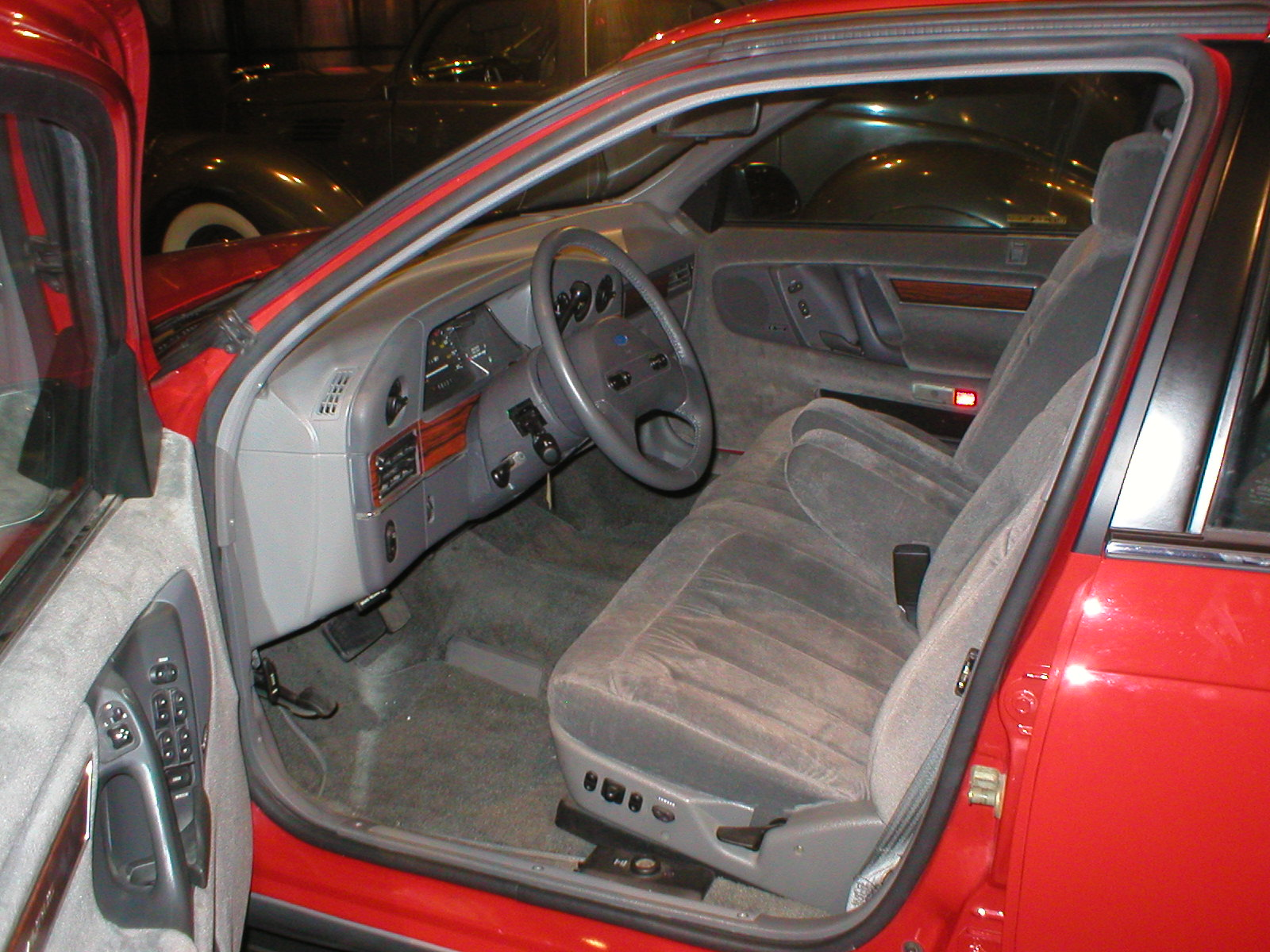
The interior of a 1986 Taurus LX equipped with the column-mounted shifter and front bench seat configuration.

Along with the exterior of the Taurus, its interior is credited with introducing many innovations that were later adopted onto all cars industry wide. The interior was designed to be extremely user friendly, with all of its controls designed to be recognizable by touch, allowing the driver to operate them without taking their eyes off the road. For example, the switches to the power windows and power locks were designed with one half of the switch raised up, with the other half recessed, in order for its function to be identified by touch (akin to the concept of Braille writing). To further enhance this "user friendliness", the dashboard was designed to have all of the controls in the central area, within reach of the driver. The left side of the dash also curved slightly around the driver, to make controls easily accessible as well as creating a "cockpit" feel. However, it wasn't curved enough to prevent the passenger from easily identifying and using the vehicle's main controls as well.

The interior of the Taurus was highly customizable by the buyer to fit their needs, as it had a large number of options, as well as being available in three different configurations. This meant that the Taurus interior could be spartan or luxurious, depending on the buyer's choice of options. The interior equipment depended on model. The most basic model, the L (see below), came standard with just an AM radio and a front cloth bench seat, while the LX, the highest model, came with a large amount of standard equipment.

The interior received a few major upgrades during the first generation's production run. The 1989 model year Taurus got new door panels that had built-in armrests and side speakers for the stereo. For the 1990 model year, it got a redesigned dashboard. This dash was designed similar to the one it replaced, although it had a different placement for the radio, and was designed to be able to contain either cupholders or a CD player, depending on the customer's choice of options. It also received a new steering wheel with an airbag, as Ford was making it standard in all of its cars.

== Models and engines ==
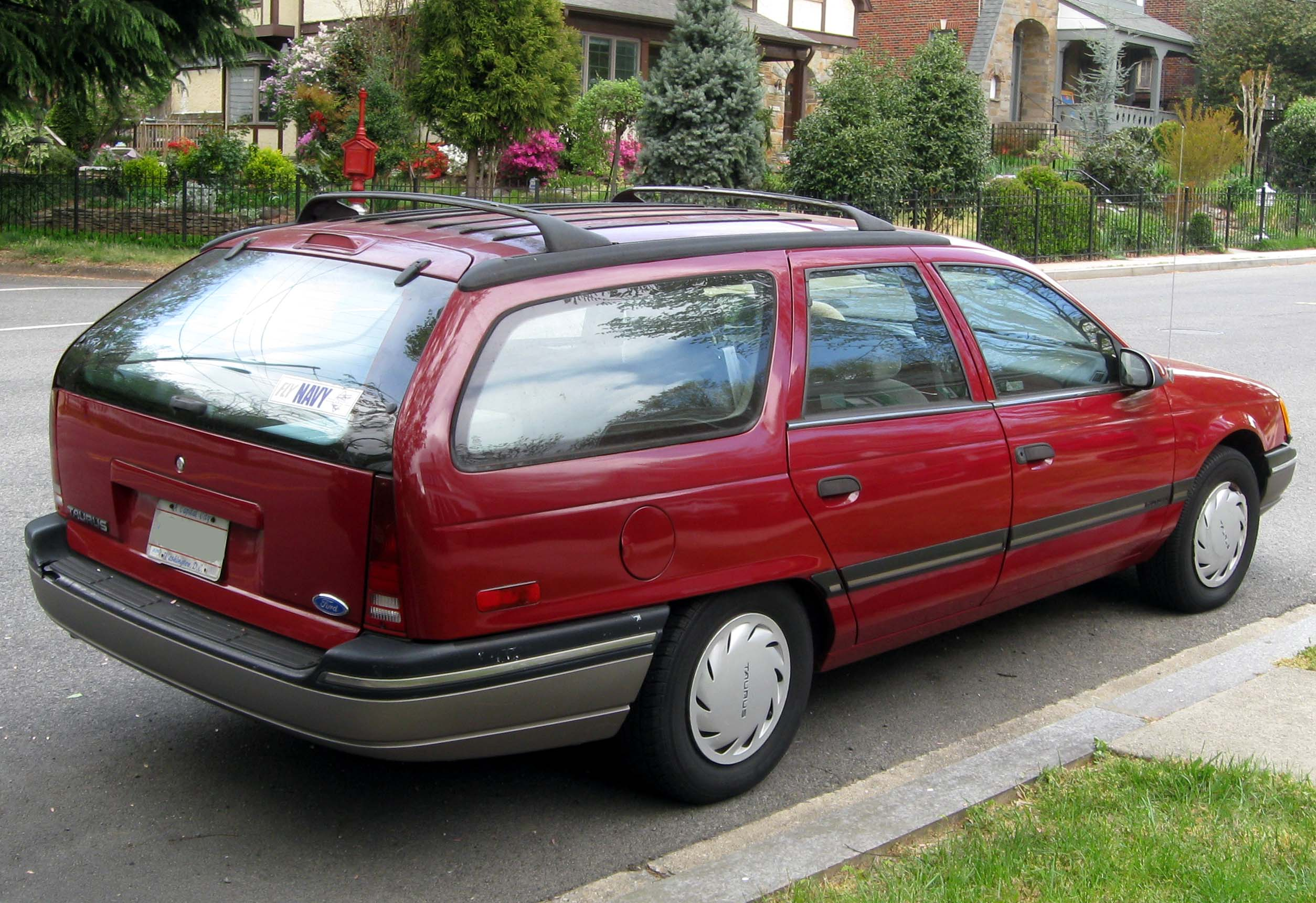
1989 Ford Taurus wagon

At its launch, the Taurus was available in four models; the L, the MT-5, the GL, and the LX. The L was the base model, with only the most basic of equipment. The MT-5 was the second model, which was aimed at Japanese imports, as it was only available with a 4-cylinder engine and a five-speed manual transmission (hence the term MT-5). The value model was the GL, which contained more equipment than the MT-5 and L, and had such interior upgrades like rear headrests and a folding rear armrest, electric windows and locks. The LX was the top of the line model, which had the most standard equipment, as well as many features that were unique to this model, such as cornering lamps and side body cladding, as well as its own unique seat design, automatic climate control, light packages, luggage convenience kit, electronic cluster with onboard system scanner and fuel computer, auto lamps with timer, premium amplified stereo with six speakers "Premium Sound", 6-way electric seats with inflatable lumbar support and other equipment options at an added price. The wagon was offered in the same trim levels in the same order.

For 1988, the MT-5 wagon was dropped due to poor sales, and the MT-5 was dropped altogether after the 1988 model year. 1989 also saw the introduction of the SHO, although it was generally marketed as and considered a separate model, as opposed to part of the Taurus line.

The MT-5 and L came with a 90 hp (67 kW) 2.5-liter HSC four-cylinder, although the 140 hp (104 kW) 3.0-liter Vulcan V6 was optional on the L and standard on the GL and LX models. The MT-5 was equipped with a five-speed manual transmission, while Vulcan models used a newly designed four-speed AXOD automatic, while HSC-equipped cars used the 3-speed ATX automatic. Ford's 3.8-liter Essex V6 was added to the lineup in 1988 as the top of the line engine optional on the LX and GL. Although the power output was rated at the same 140 hp (104 kW) as the 3.0-liter engine, this V6 produced 215 lb⋅ft (292 N⋅m) of torque. The 2.5-liter was dropped in early 1991.

=== Ford Taurus SHO ===
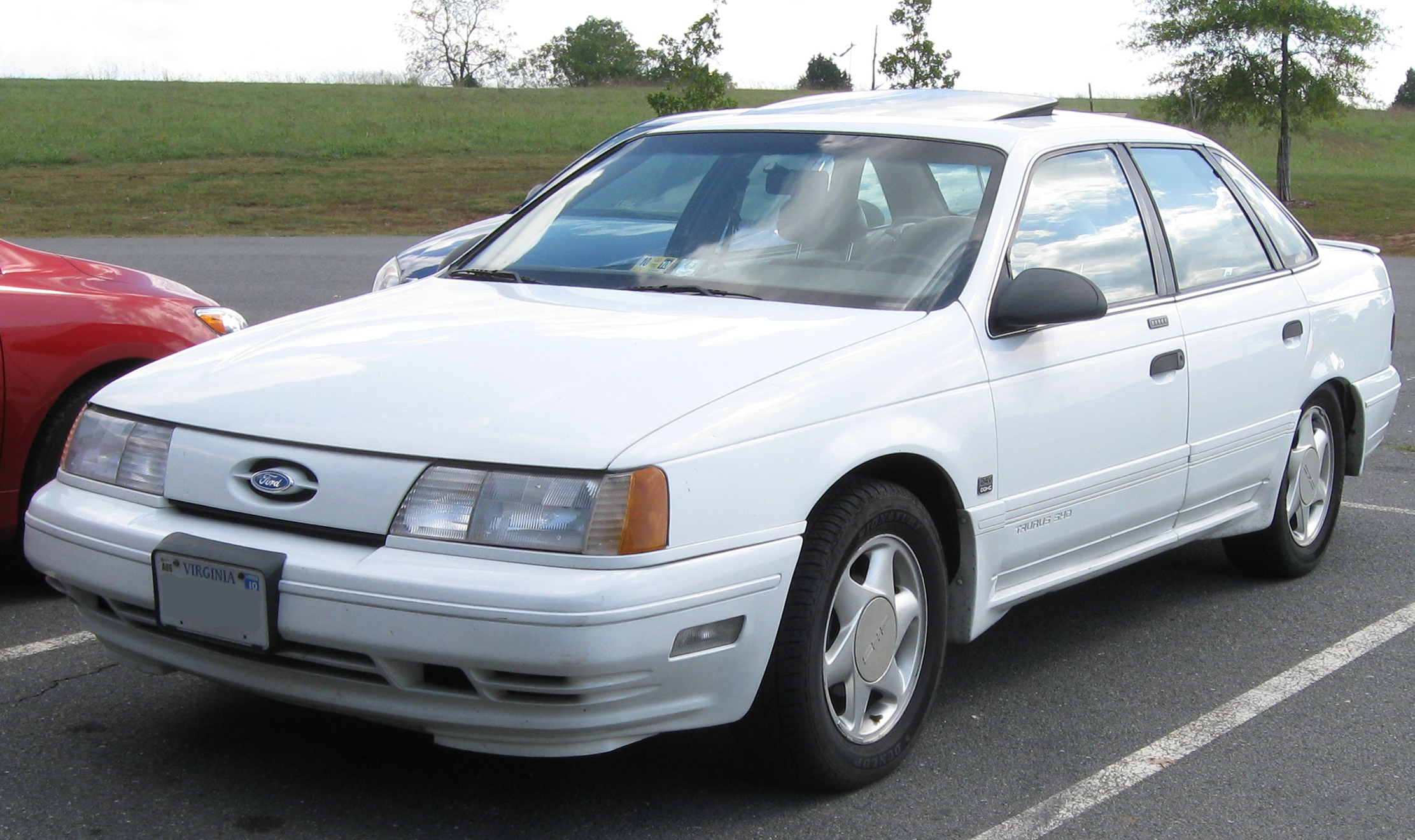
Ford Taurus SHO front view

The Ford Taurus SHO (Super High Output) is a high-performance model of the Taurus that was introduced in late 1988 as a 1989 model. Sharing its body shell with the Taurus sedan (no SHO wagon was produced), the SHO differed from the standard Taurus in its drivetrain, suspension, brakes, wheels, and cosmetic changes to the bodywork and interior. The 3.0L DOHC V6 was developed and built for Ford by Yamaha. At 220 hp (164 kW), the engine was rated only 5 hp less than the 4.9L V8 of the Ford Mustang; all examples were paired with a 5-speed manual transmission.

Developed by Ford SVO as its first four-door vehicle, the Taurus SHO began life as a limited-production vehicle for 1989 (with Ford advertising it as such). Along with its performance specifications, the use of the Yamaha V6 was chosen partially to fulfill a supply contract, as Ford had shelved previous plans to use it for a mid-engine sports car intended to compete with the Pontiac Fiero and Toyota MR2.

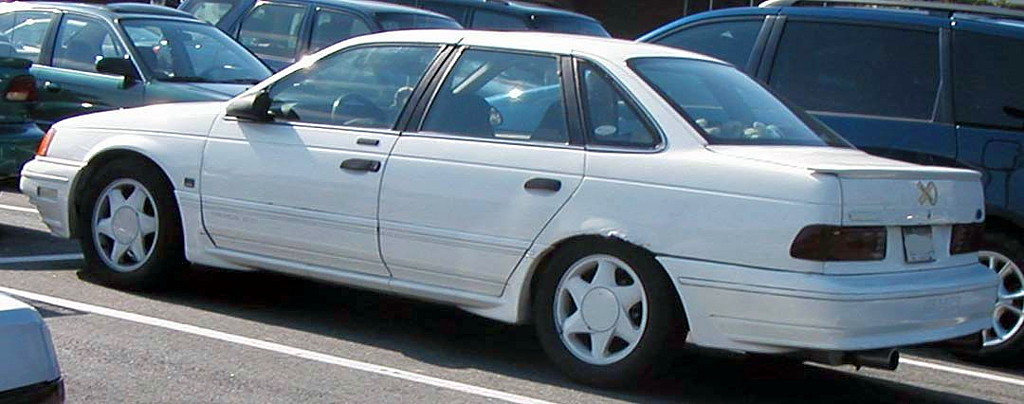
Ford Taurus SHO rear view

Following stronger-than-intended sales of the model line, Ford allowed continued production of the SHO as the flagship of the Taurus range. The variant was produced through 1991 and was included for the second-generation Ford Taurus redesign for 1992.

== Production ==
The Ford Taurus and Mercury Sable were produced by Ford in Chicago, Illinois (Chicago Assembly) and Hapeville, Georgia (Atlanta Assembly), replacing the Ford LTD/Mercury Marquis in both assembly facilities.

Production Figures

Ford Taurus Production Figures
	Sedan	Wagon	Yearly Total
1986	178,737	57,625	236,362
1987	278,562	96,201	374,763
1988	294,576	93,001	387,577
1989	284,175	87,013	371,188
1990	233,153	75,531	308,684
1991	218,311	62,786	281,097
Total	1,487,514	472,157	1,959,671

== Variants ==
=== Mercury Sable ===
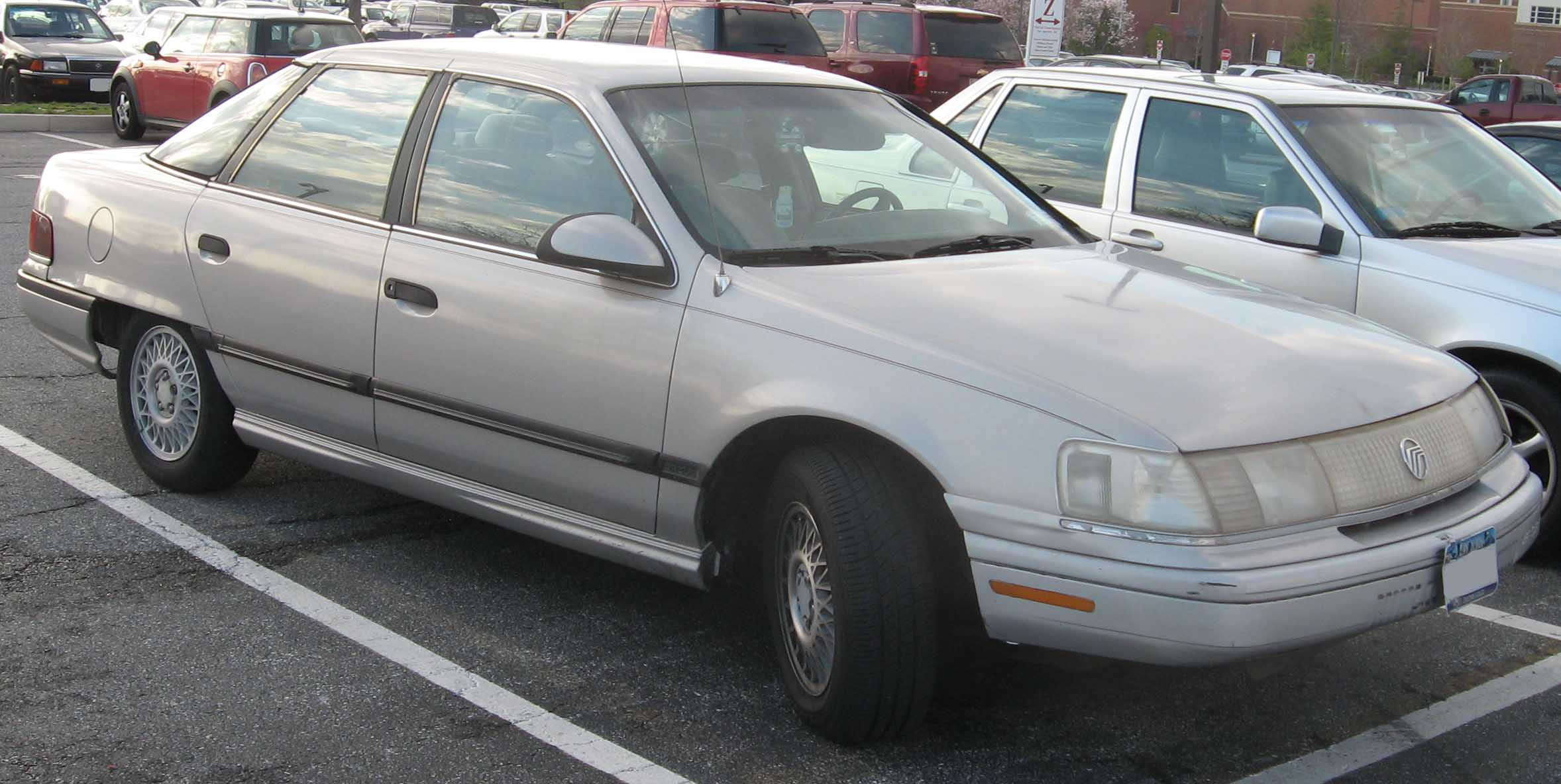
First-generation Mercury Sable sedan

The Mercury Sable is the Mercury counterpart of the Ford Taurus, sold by the Lincoln-Mercury division. Serving as the replacement for the Mercury Marquis, the Sable was developed alongside the Taurus, with both vehicles sharing a common chassis and drivetrain. Sharing only the doors and roof stamping with the Taurus, the Sable sedan has a slightly longer body and its own interior; the station wagons of both model lines are based on the Sable.

In Mercury tradition, the Sable was designed as the upscale of the two model lines. In contrast to its predecessor and the larger Mercury Grand Marquis, the Sable was designed as even more advanced than its Taurus counterpart, with blacked-out roof pillars (for a wraparound effect for the rear quarter glass) and low-cut rear wheel openings. In place of a conventional grille, a low-wattage "lightbar" lamp was fitted between the front headlamps.

Offered solely with an automatic transmission, the Sable was offered in a standard GS trim and deluxe LS trim in both sedan and station wagon body styles. Ford exported the Sable as the Ford Taurus in Mexico, Europe, and New Zealand.

==== Prototypes ====
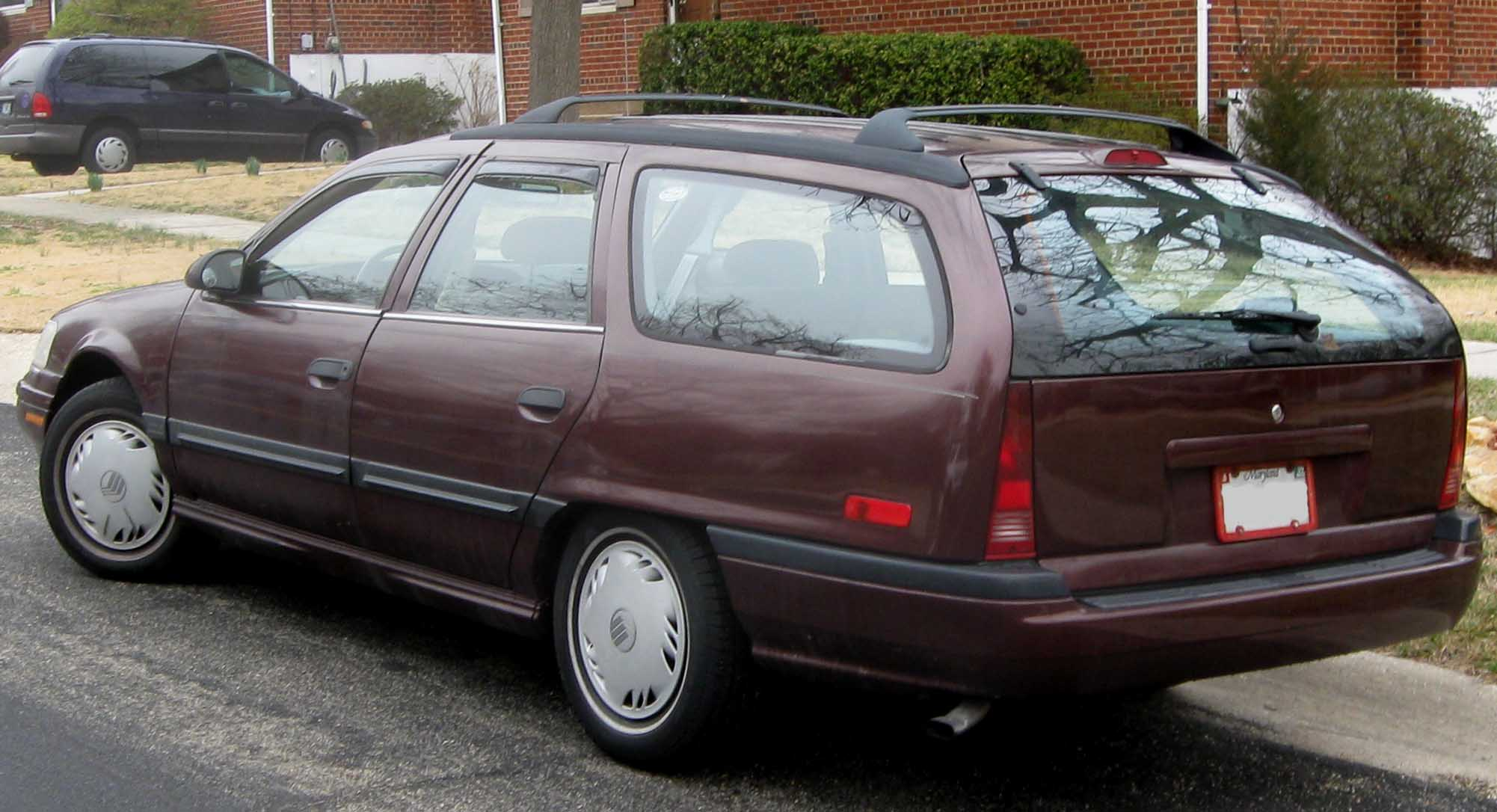
First-generation Mercury Sable wagon

A prototype convertible Sable was displayed at the 1988 North American International Auto Show, featuring a custom two-door body with a power folding top that was built off a production sedan chassis. It never reached production, and the convertible prototype was sold on eBay in 2006.

Mercury planned a Sable LTS for 1989 as a divisional counterpart of the Taurus SHO, sharing its performance upgrades (with the exception of the Yamaha V6). Shelved out of fears of creating unnecessary internal competition, the Sable LTS saw production for 1989 as 50th Anniversary Edition (of Mercury) Sable; 50 examples were produced with 3.8L V6s, largely serving as testbeds for Taurus SHO chassis changes.

The Sable was also extensively used in Ford's Aluminum Intensive Vehicle (AIV) program, which built 20 aluminum-bodied Sables with Taurus SHO V6 engines in an engineering exercise for constructing an all-aluminum unit body, like that which saw production by Audi in 1994.

== In popular culture ==
In 1987's Robocop Officer Alex Murphy/Robocop can be seen driving a modified Gunmetal Gray Taurus LX.

In the 1990s Television show The Flash Barry Allen/The Flash can be seen driving a Maroon colored Taurus.

A 1989 Ford Taurus is mentioned in Volume 5 of the web horror series The Mandela Catalogue.
