= Fruit Gushers =

Fruit snack with liquid filling

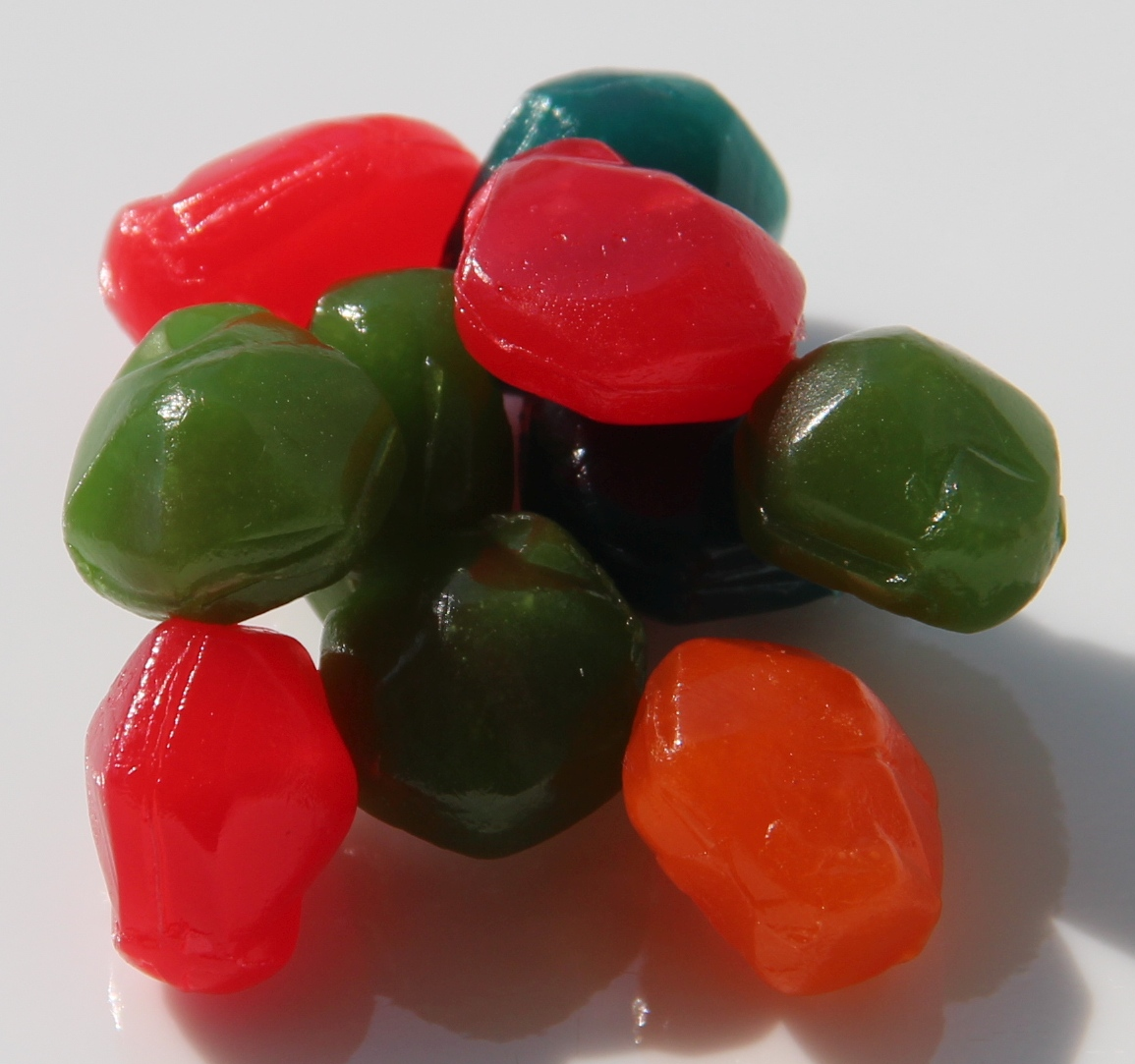
- Fruit Gushers (2017)
- Alternative names: Gushers
- Type: Fruit snack
- Invented: 1991
- Food energy (per 28 g serving): 90 kcal (380 kJ)

Fruit Gushers (also simply Gushers) are a Betty Crocker-branded fruit snack introduced in 1991. They are described as soft and chewy with a fruity-juice center.

== History ==
Fruit Gushers were introduced in 1991 as a Betty Crocker fruit snack. Each box of Fruit Gushers was list priced at US$2.19 (equivalent to $5.18 in 2025) and contained six pouches of Gushers, each of which had nine individual pieces for 90 calories (380 kJ) per pouch.

== Composition ==
Strawberry-flavored Fruit Gushers are composed of sugar, dried corn syrup, corn syrup, modified corn starch, fructose, pear concentrate, and grape juice concentrate.

Developed to appeal to children, Fruit Gushers are acorn-shaped with a soft "licorice-like" exterior and a liquid inside, such as "strawberries and pear puree concentrate". In 1991, Fruit Gushers were available in two flavors: "Strawberry Splash" and "Gushin' Grape".

In 2003, one serving of any Fruit Gushers variety was one 0.9-ounce (26 g) package with 90 calories, containing zero grams (0 oz) of protein, one gram (0.035 oz) of fat, and 20 grams (0.71 oz) of carbohydrates. In 2018, a 28 grams (0.99 oz) serving size of Strawberry Fruit Gushers, by comparison, had 90 calories, and contained nine grams (0.32 oz) of sugar, one gram of fat, and cost $0.46 (equivalent to $0.59 in 2025). Prior to 2025, the serving size was reduced to 0.8 ounces (23 g), containing 80 calories, and having ten grams (0.35 oz) of sugar.

== Varieties ==
Betty Crocker released a new variety of Fruit Gushers in early 2020: "Galactic Fruit Gushers". These featured the flavors "Asteroid Apple", "Berry Star Cluster", and a mystery flavor labeled "Unidentified Flavored Object"; the latter was part of a contest where consumers could guess at the unknown flavor and win prizes "like sweatshirts, hats, blankets, PopSockets, and more". Galactic Fruit Gushers were sold through Walmart.com for $5.88 (equivalent to $7.32 in 2025).

In June 2024, the brand announced that its most-popular flavor, watermelon (previously available from 1997–2013), was returning to store shelves to meet consumer demands; combined with sour-apple flavored Gushers, boxes of six sachets were to be sold for $6.49 (equivalent to $6.66 in 2025), while boxes of ten sachets would sell for $10.29 (equivalent to $10.56 in 2025).

== Reception ==
A 1991 Sun-Sentinel review said that the insides oozed rather than gushed, and found the confectionery surprisingly pleasant. In 2013, Complex magazine ranked Fruit Gushers the second-best fruit snack of all time, coming in behind another Betty Crocker product, Shark Bites.

In September 2023, police in St. Marys, Kansas reported misinformation of seizing fruit snacks and gummies, laced with tetrahydrocannabinol, being packaged as real commercial brands thereof—including Fruit Gushers.

== See also ==
- Fruit by the Foot – Fruit-based snack made by General Mills
- Fruit Roll-Ups – American fruit snacks that originated in the 1980s
