= Jack Telnack =

American car designer (born 1937)

- Born: John J. Telnack; 1937 (age 88–89); Detroit, Michigan, U.S.
- Education: ArtCenter College of Design
- Occupation: automobile designer
- Years active: 1958–1997
- Employer: Ford Motor Company
- Notable work: 1979 Ford Mustang; 1983 Ford Thunderbird; 1986 Ford Taurus
- Spouse: Marguerite McCarthy Senter

John J. Telnack (born 1937) is an American automobile designer who served as Ford Motor Company's global Vice President of Design from 1980 to 1997. He is best known for his work on cars like the 1979 Ford Mustang, the 1983 Ford Thunderbird, and the 1986 Ford Taurus. He is also a member of the Automotive Hall of Fame.

== Early life and education ==
Telnack was born in Detroit. His interest in car design began in early childhood, evidenced by his frequent bicycle trips to Ford's Rotunda building to see the latest concept cars.

Telnack's father worked as a foreman at Ford's River Rouge complex. In 1952, he arranged to take Jack on a tour of Ford's Design Center. He received a scholarship from Ford and attended the ArtCenter College of Design in Pasadena, California, and graduated in 1958.

== Career ==
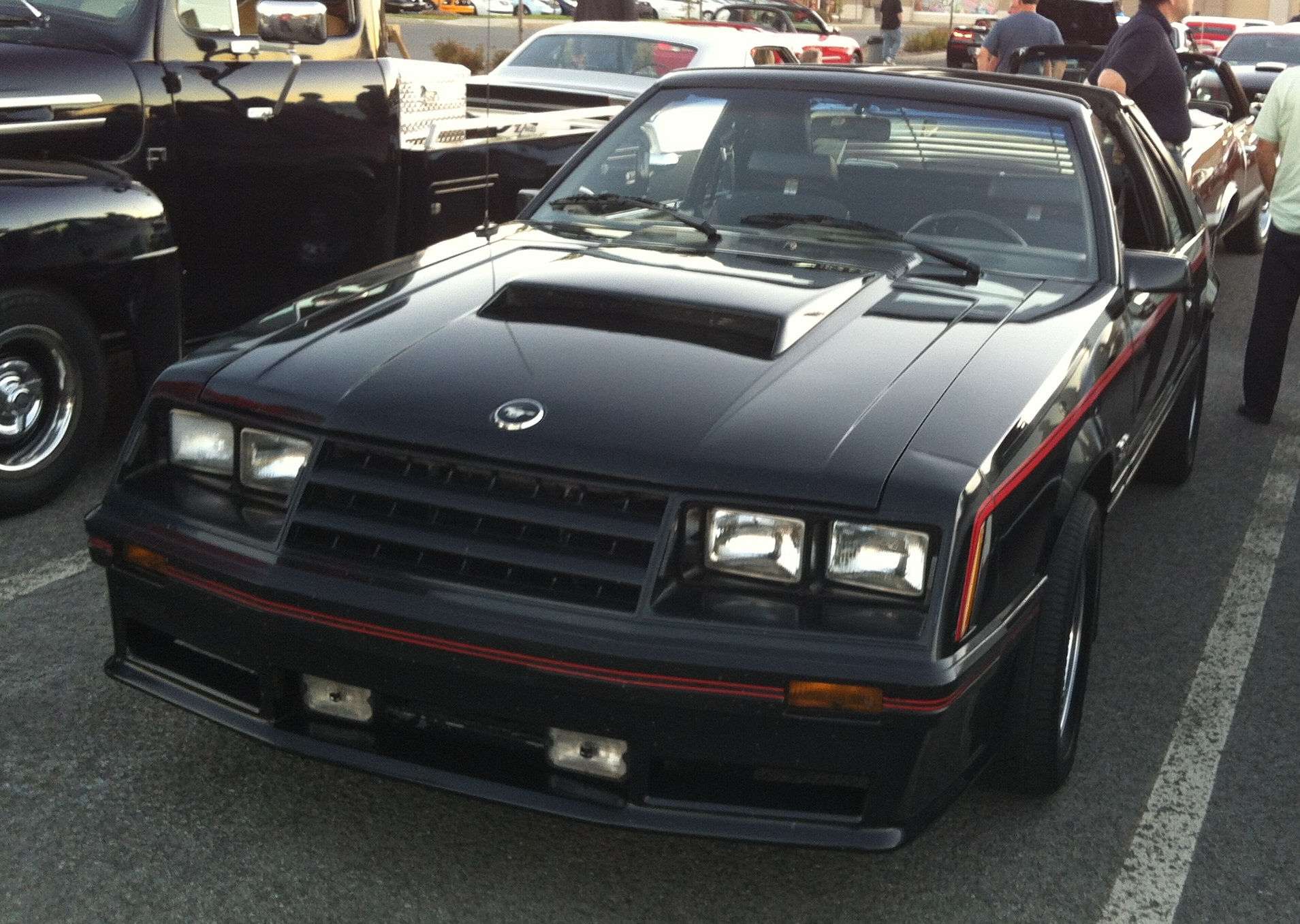
The third generation 1979 Ford Mustang Liftback (Les chauds vendredis '14)

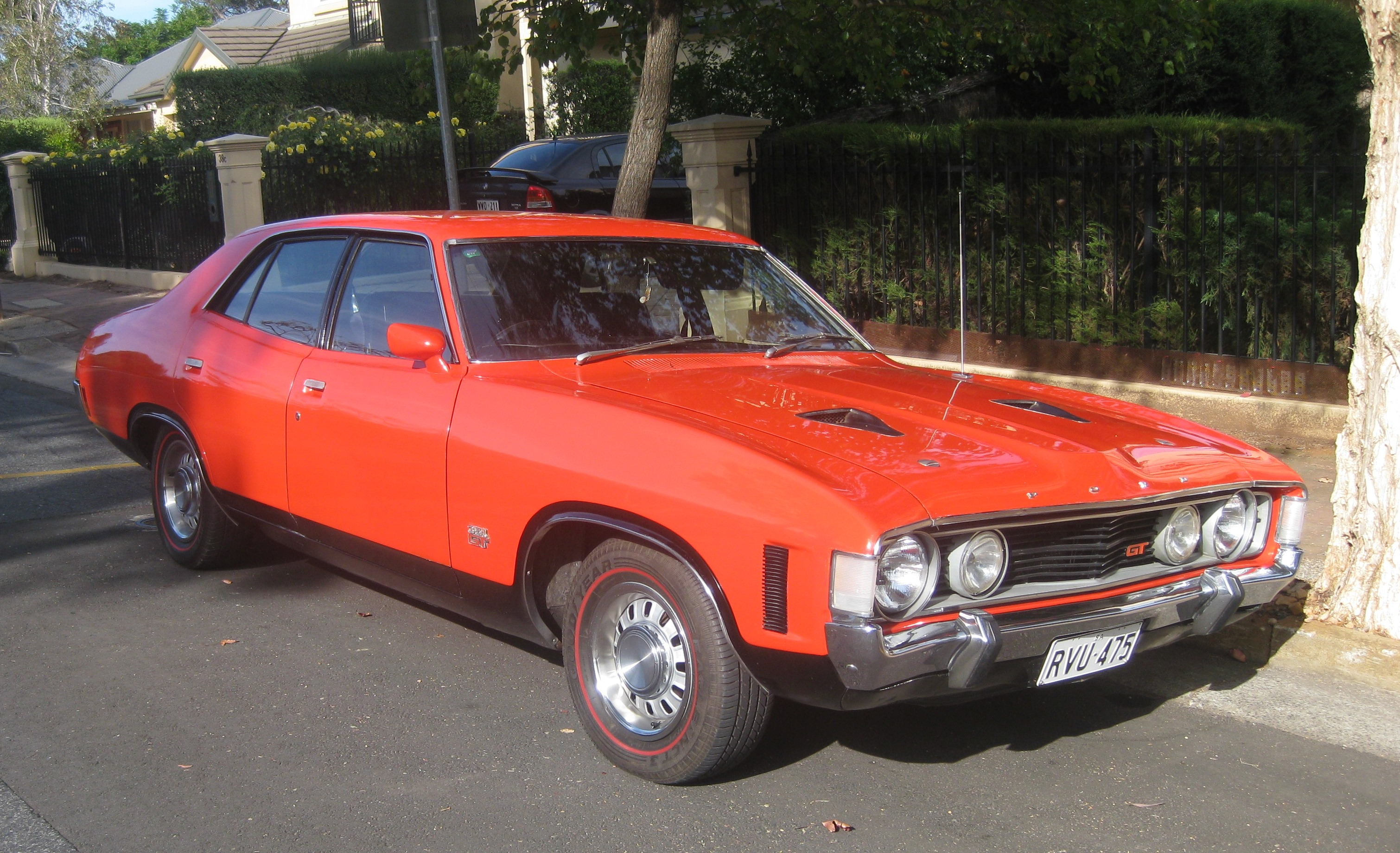
Australian XA Falcon designed by Jack Telnack for Ford Australia

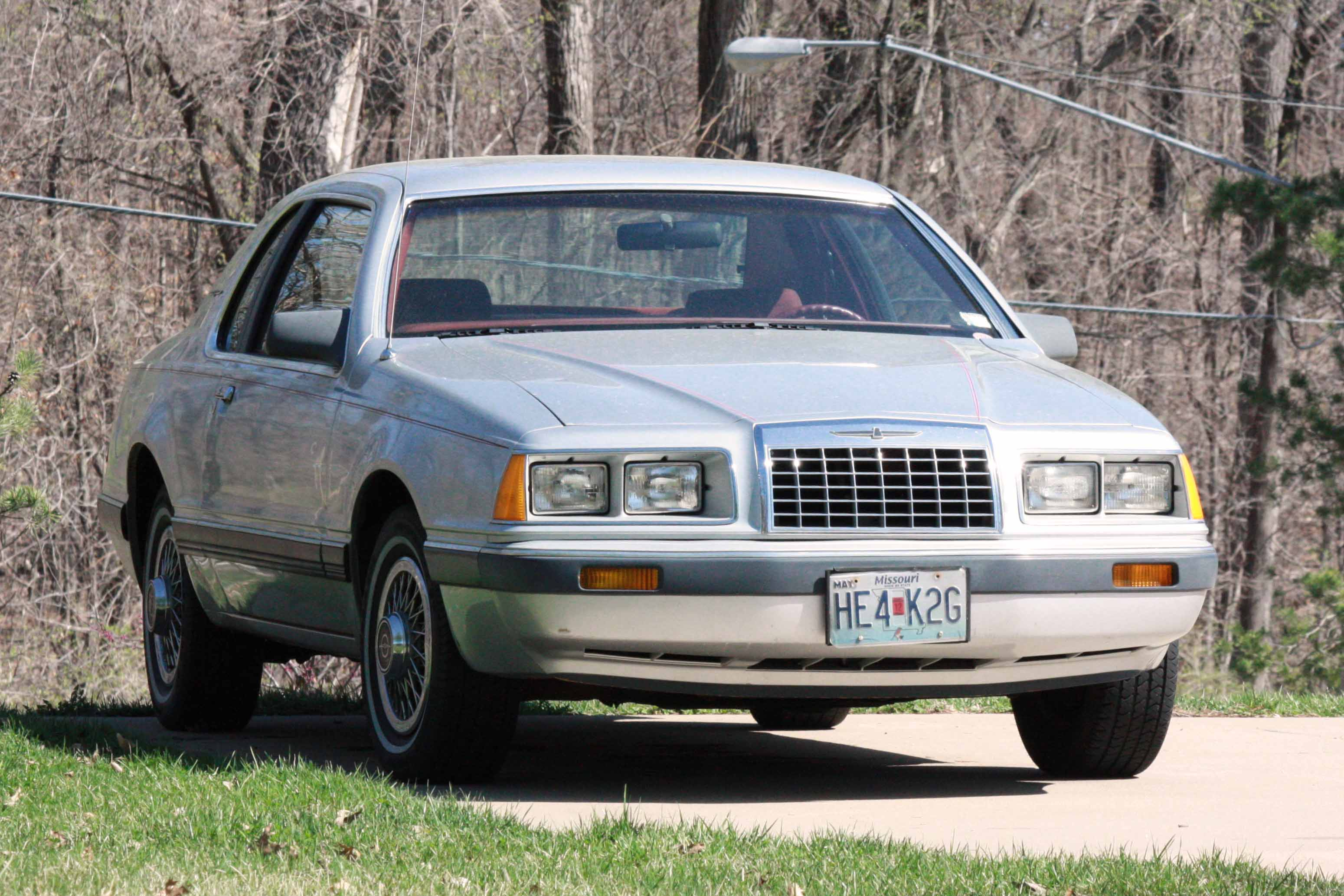
83 Ford Thunderbird

After his completing his education in 1958, Telnack accepted a design job at Ford. His initial assignments were focused on small design details and ornamentation. During his early career, he designed boats in his free time. After presenting his portfolio to the Trojan Boat Company, he was offered a job, which he ultimately declined. He became the head stylist of the Lincoln-Mercury Division in 1965. In 1966, he was named the chief designer of Ford of Australia, where he led the redesign of the Australian Ford Falcon. In 1969, he returned to the United States and worked on the 1972 Ford Mustang fastback. He then went on to serve as the vice president of design for Ford in Europe in 1974.

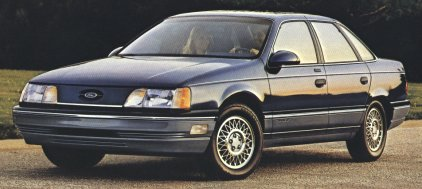
Ford Taurus LX

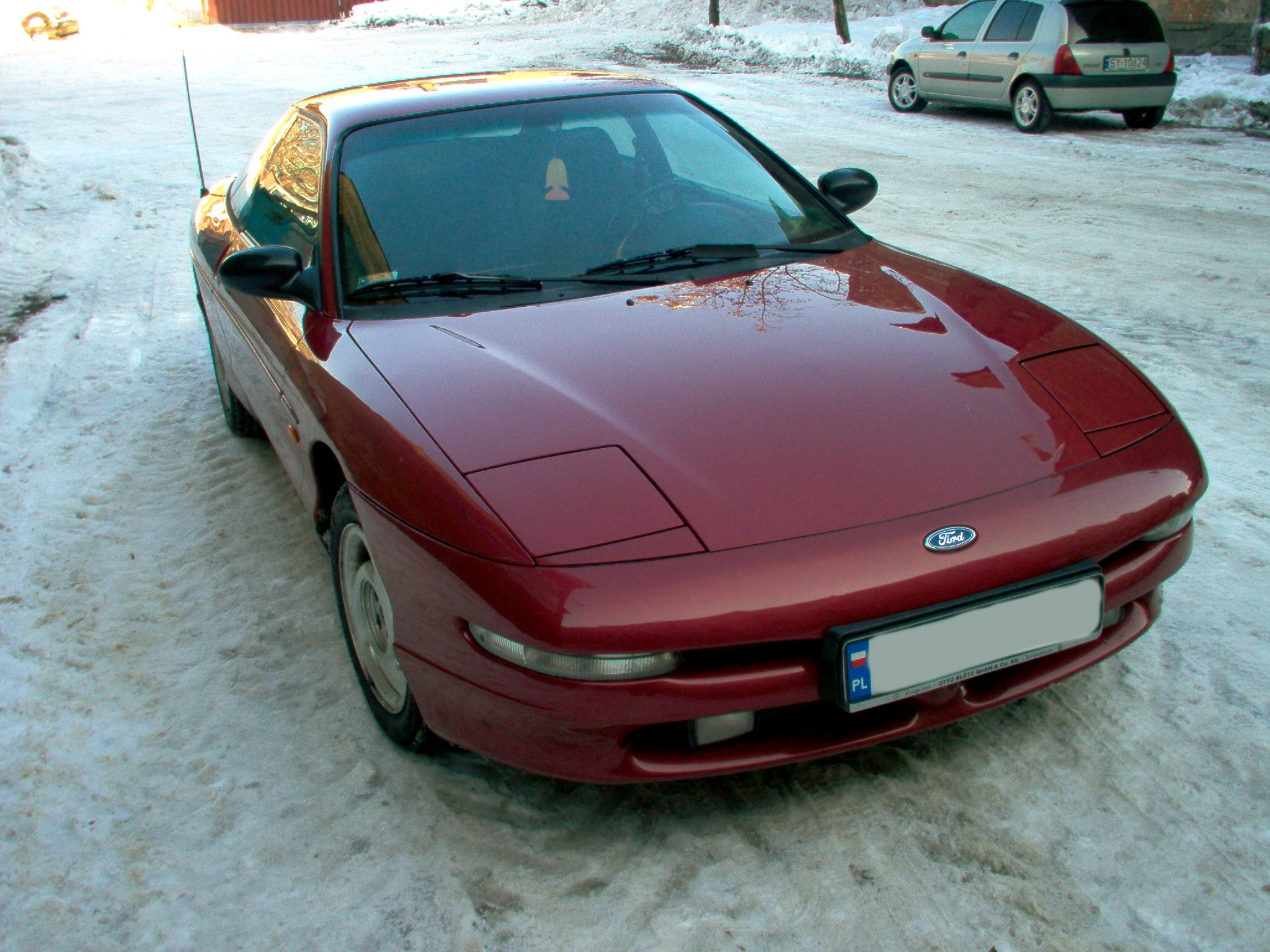
Ford Probe GT

Ushering a new era of aerodynamic design to America's mainstream marketplace, Telnack and his team of designers were responsible for cars like the 1979 Ford Mustang, the 1983 Ford Thunderbird, the 1984 Ford Tempo and the 1984 Continental Mark VII were moderate successes that showed Ford's intention to change their traditional design language for a more contemporary, European style.

Telnack and his team of designers were also responsible for the 1986 Ford Taurus, which was a car widely acknowledged as the main reason why Ford Motor Company's turnaround strategy was successful during the 1980s. He and his designers were known collectively as "Team Taurus". The Taurus' wind-cheating design language influenced everything from the Ford F-150 to the Lincoln Town Car in the 1990s. The Taurus's sibling, the 1986 Mercury Sable, boasted a wind cheating drag coefficient of 0.29. The Sable's light bar grille continued to be a Mercury design hallmark for the next decade. Telnack also helped shape the 1989 Ford Probe and 1993 Lincoln Mark VIII.

In June 1987, following the success of the Taurus, Telnack was elected vice president of Ford. In 1993, he became chief of Ford's seven design studios throughout the world.

Toward the end of his career, Telnack worked on the ovoid-themed 1996 third generation Taurus, which was criticized widely and deemed too radical for the market's tastes.

Telnack also created the "New Edge" style that brought about cars like the 1996 Ford Ka, Ford GT90 concept car and influenced the design of the 1998 Ford Focus.

Telnack retired from his post at the end of 1997, and was replaced by J Mays.

== Personal life ==
Telnack divorced in 1990. He later married Marguerite McCarthy Senter of Los Angeles.

== Awards and honors ==
- Automotive Executive of the Year 1989
- EyesOn Design Lifetime Design Achievement Award, 2006
- Automotive Hall of Fame inductee, 2008
