= Fruit snack =

Fruit-flavored gummy confection

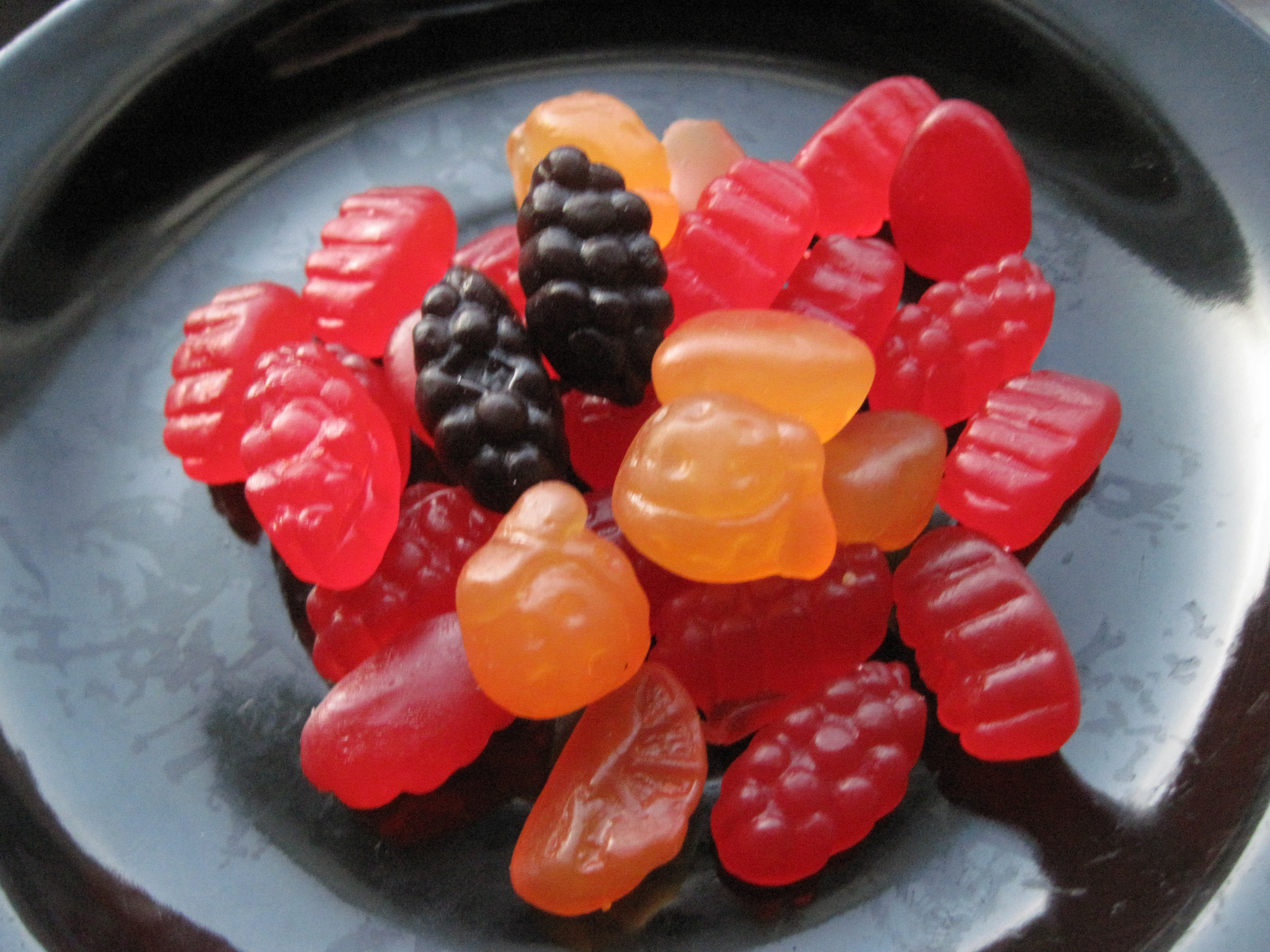
Welch's fruit snacks

A fruit snack is a type of gummy candy made with fruit flavoring and gelatin. They were first made by confectioner Louis Shalhoub in the 1970s as a high energy candy for backpackers. Although they are often marketed as a healthier alternative to regular gummy candies, the veracity of these claims is disputed, as they typically contain fruit flavoring instead of actual fruit.

== History ==
The first modern fruit snack was Joray Fruit Rolls, which were developed by confectioner Louis Shalhoub in the 1970s. It was used by backpackers as a lightweight, high-energy food.

The name fruit snack was first used in 1983 by General Mills, which they used to describe their version of Shalhoub's product, Fruit Roll-Ups.

By the mid-1980s, the fruit snack was a multimillion-dollar business. However, sales peaked in 2013 and declined over the next few years.

== Nutrition ==
More than half the weight of the fruit snacks is simple sugars. They also contain an average of 12% water by weight, 25% starch, a small amount of fat, and a negligible amount of protein.

The nutritional value or content of fruit snacks has long been contested. Much of the controversy surrounds the nutritional value, especially surrounding its sugar content, which is found in large amounts in some fruit snacks.

Despite the overall lack of nutritional value, most fruit snacks have a considerable portion of vitamin C but tend to be lacking in most other micronutrients.

== Lawsuits ==
In some cases, manufactures of fruit snacks have faced class-action lawsuits over their marketing claims that fruit snacks are "healthy".

- In 2015, two women, Plaintiffs Aliza Atik and Winnie Lau, filed a class-action lawsuit in New York against Welch's Fruit Snacks, alleging illegal supplementation with vitamins, in violation of the jelly bean rule. The jellybean rule prohibits food manufacturers from deceiving consumers into buying candy by adding vitamins and marketing the candy as a healthful food. The licensed manufacturer replied that the complaint is without merit, "It is a fact that fruit, whether in the form of juices or more recently purees, has always been the first ingredient in Welch’s Fruit Snacks. Our labeling is truthful and gives consumers the information they need to make informed decisions.” The case was voluntarily dismissed in 2017.
- In 2017, another person filed a class-action lawsuit in New Jersey against Welch's Fruit Snacks, alleging that the snack food is marketed as being more healthful than similar products despite being nutritionally similar to candy.
