= Jelly bean =

Small bean-shaped candy with many different flavors

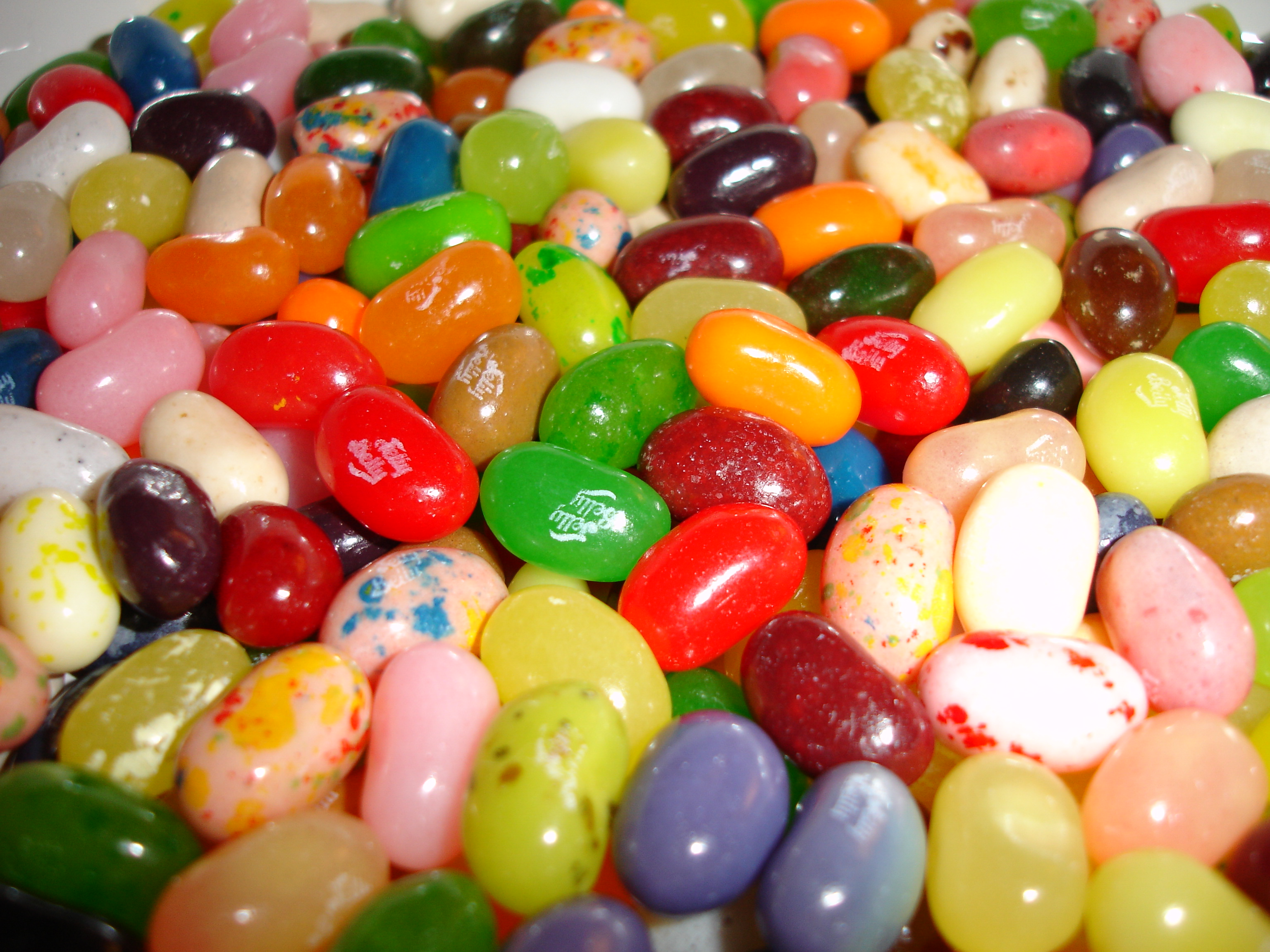
- Jelly Belly jelly bean flavor and color assortment
- Type: Confectionery
- Place of origin: Boston, Massachusetts, United States
- Created by: William Schrafft

Jelly beans are small, sometimes medium sized bean-shaped sugar candies with soft candy shells and thick gel interiors (see gelatin and jelly). The confection is primarily made of sugar and sold in a wide variety of colors and wacky flavours.

== History ==
It has been claimed that jelly beans were first sold in 1861, when Boston confectioner William Schrafft urged people to buy them as gifts for soldiers in the American Civil War. A more definite reference appears in food testing records of the United States Department of Agriculture published in 1887. Most historians suggest that jelly beans were first associated with celebrations of Easter in the United States sometime during the 1930s due to their egg-like shape.

== Manufacture ==
The basic ingredients of jelly beans include sugar, tapioca, corn syrup, and pectin or starch. Relatively minor amounts of the emulsifying agent lecithin, anti-foaming agents, an edible wax such as carnauba wax or beeswax, salt, and confectioner's glaze are also included. The ingredients that give each bean its character are also relatively small in proportion and may vary depending on the flavor.

== Slang ==
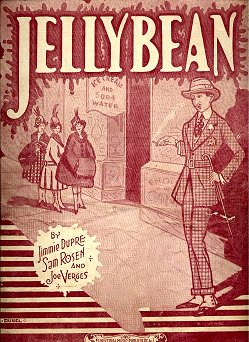
1920 sheet music cover

In United States slang during the 1910s and early 1920s, a jellybean or jelly-bean was a young man who dressed stylishly but had little else to recommend him, similar to the older terms dandy and fop. F. Scott Fitzgerald published a story, "The Jelly-Bean", about such a character in 1920.

== In popular culture ==
When Beatlemania broke out in the US in 1964, fans of the Beatles in the US pelted the band with jelly beans (emulating fans in the UK who threw the British candy Jelly Babies at George Harrison, who reportedly liked eating them).

President Ronald Reagan's favorite treat was jelly beans.

== See also ==
- Starch mogul
- Dragée
- Gummy bear
- Skittles (confectionery)
- Turkish delight
- Jujube (confectionery)
- Gumdrop
- Jelly bean rule
