= Joray Fruit Rolls =

American apricot-based fruit snack

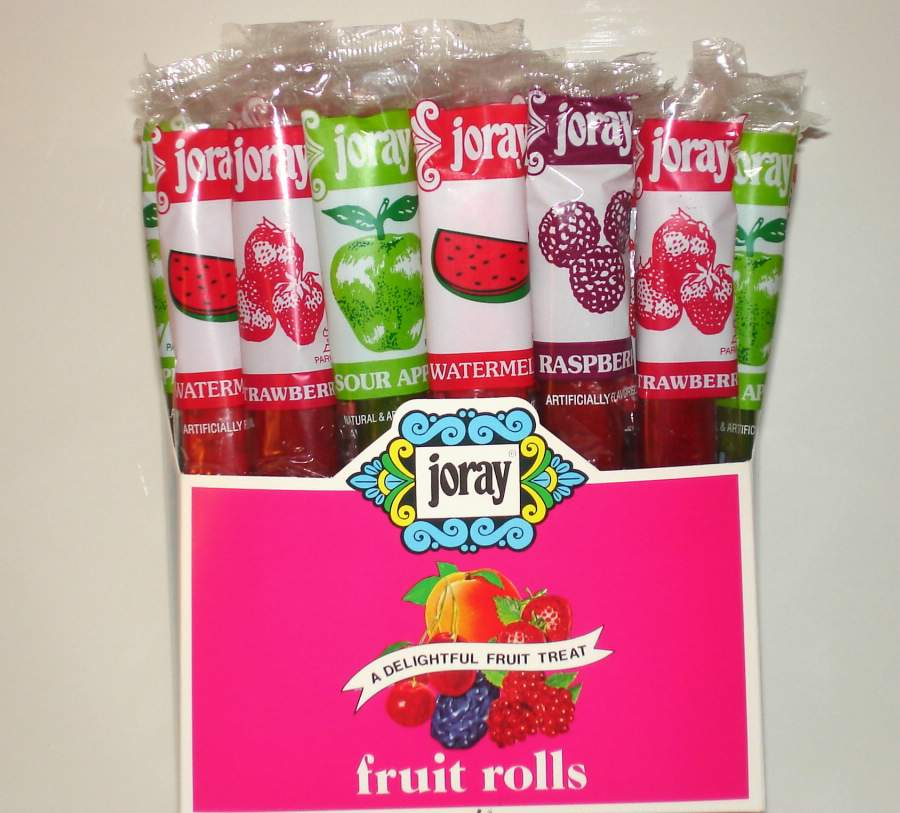
A box of variously flavored fruit rolls

Joray Fruit Rolls are an apricot-based fruit snack produced by Joseph Shalhoub & Son, Inc, founded 1886 by George Shalhoub after immigrating from Lebanon. Joray Fruit Rolls were developed by Louis Shalhoub in the 1970s and have been produced in New York City since then. The fruit roll is a derivative of the Levantine confection, amardeen, a thick paste made from dried apricots. Made from real fruit, these fruit leather products are fat-free and kosher.

== Flavors ==
Joray Fruit Rolls come in 10 different flavors.

- Apricot
- Watermelon
- Strawberry
- Cherry
- Sour Apple
- Pineapple
- Grape
- Fruit Punch
- Raspberry
- Sour Plum
- Orange (discontinued)
