= Fruit Roll-Ups =

American fruit snacks that originated in the 1980s

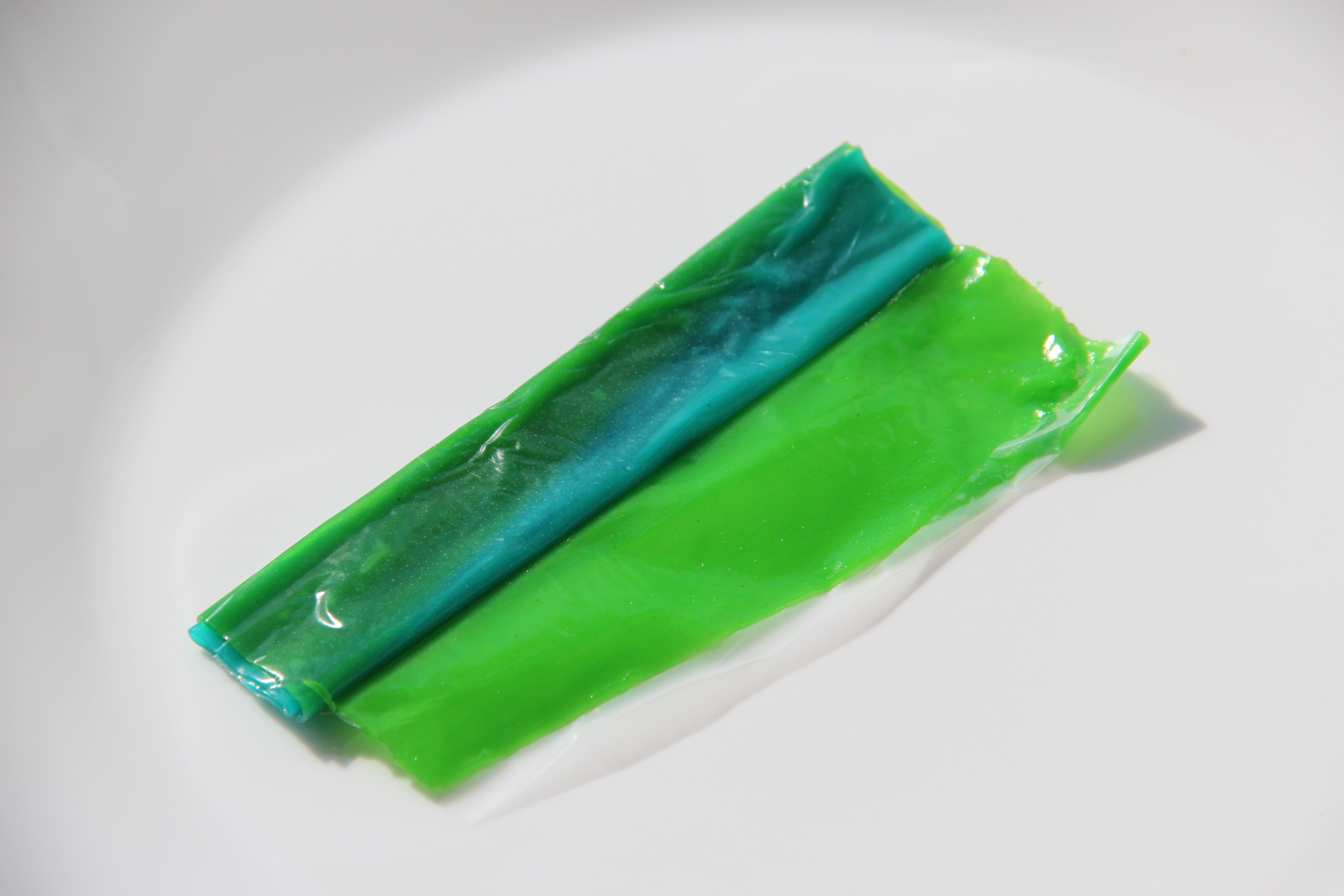
A Fruit Roll-Up

Fruit Roll-Ups is a fruit-flavored snack brand first sold in grocery stores in 1979 by General Mills under its Fruit Corners label, a subsidiary of Betty Crocker.

The product is a flat, corn-syrup-based, fruit-flavored sheet rolled into a tube and laid on cellophane to keep it from sticking to itself.

Today, Fruit Roll-Ups remain manufactured by General Mills and distributed under the Betty Crocker brand in the United States and under the Uncle Tobys brand in Australia. Several similar products have been marketed by General Mills and by other companies.

== History ==
General Mills' research for the product began in 1975.

Joray Fruit Rolls are a round, fruit leather product from New York that predates Fruit Roll-Ups. Fruit Roll-Ups have a more rubbery texture than the natural rolls and though were originally round in shape, they are now shaped like a parallelogram.

== Advertising ==
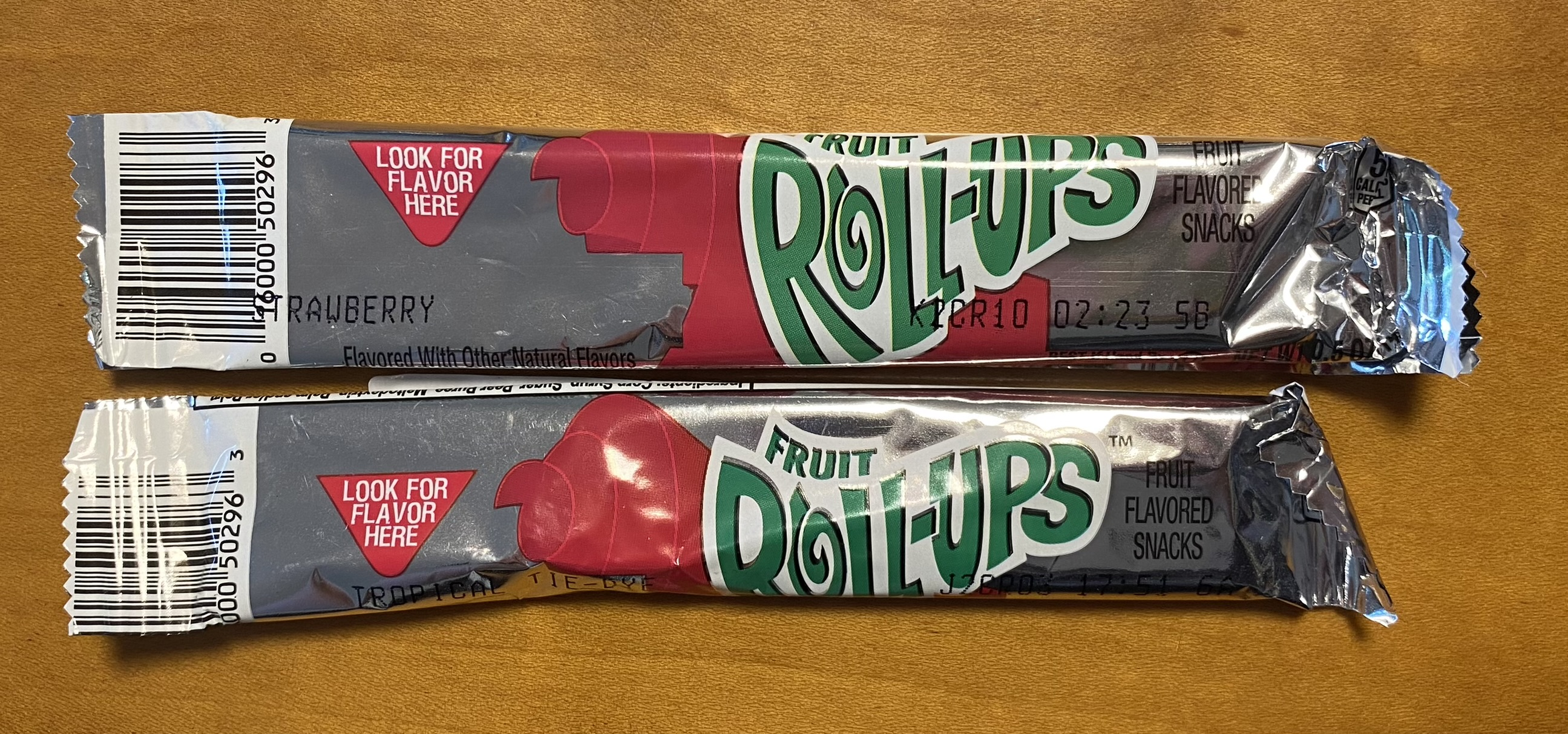
Product packaging

Fruit Corners Fruit Roll-Ups were heavily marketed on television in America throughout the early 1980s. Most spots featured the tag line "Fruit Corners Fruit Roll-Ups: Real fruit and fun, rolled up in one." Later spots featured children innovating in the "Fruit Roll-Up Fun Factory".

The overall marketing theme is that parents can feed their children "fun" processed foods that are based on real fruit. Studies of American mothers have shown that the mothers are surprised at how sweet Fruit Roll-Ups are and how little fruit is present in them. For example, the strawberry flavor contains no strawberries, and the only ingredient derived from fruit is concentrated pear juice.

Fruit Roll-Ups have featured variants on the original plain sheets such as punch out shapes on the rolls and temporary tattoos for tongues and formerly on skin.

- Berry Lemonade/Cherry Slushie
- Crazy Pix Cool Chix Berry Wave
- Crazy Pix Wild Ones Blastin' Berry
- Electric Blue Raspberry
- Flavor Wave

Betty Crocker sells Fruit Roll-Ups in single-flavor boxes and flavor variety packs.

== Ingredients ==
Fruit Roll-Ups (strawberry flavor)
Nutritional value per 100 g (3.5 oz)
- Energy: 1,562 kJ (373 kcal)
- Carbohydrates: 85.2 g
- Sugars: 38.7 g
- Fat: 3.5 g
- Protein: 0.1 g
- Other constituents: Quantity
- Water: 10.2 g
- ^{†}Percentages estimated using US recommendations for adults.

The main ingredient is sugar, and Fruit Roll-Ups contain five different types of sugar: sugar from pear juice concentrate, corn syrup, dried corn syrup, sugar, and a small amount of dextrose. They also contain small amounts of partially hydrogenated cottonseed oil, citric acid, sodium citrate, acetylated monoglycerides, fruit pectin, malic acid, ascorbic acid, natural flavors, and artificial colors.

=== Lawsuit over health claims ===
In 2011, the Center for Science in the Public Interest sued General Mills over Fruit Roll-Ups, saying that their packaging and marketing was misleading because it presented the product as a nutritious, healthful, fruit-filled snack, despite having approximately the same nutritional profile as gummy bear candies. The lawsuit was settled out of court with General Mills agreeing not to put pictures of fruits on the labels, unless that fruit was actually present in that flavor of the Fruit Roll-Up, and to either stop claiming that the product is "made with real fruit", or to include in that potentially misleading statement the percentage of the Fruit Roll-Up that is made from real fruit. These changes took place in 2014.

== See also ==
- Fruit by the Foot
- Black sesame roll
- Fruit Gushers
- Sunkist Fun Fruits
