= Concentrate =

Substance from which most other base components have been removed

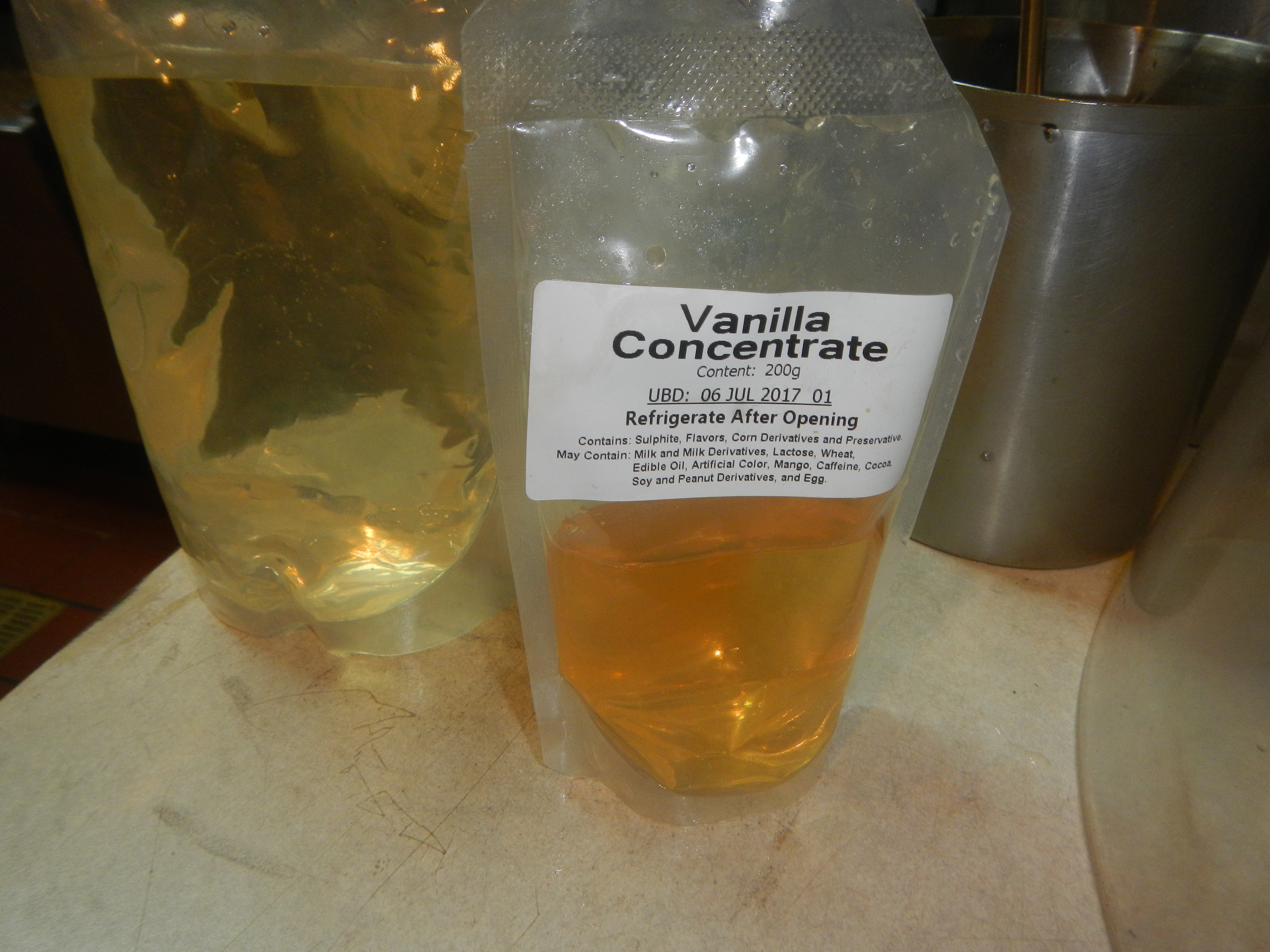
A container of vanilla concentrate

A concentrate is a form of substance that has had the majority of its diluting agent or diluent (in the case of a liquid: the solvent) removed, such that the substance becomes the majority of the composition. Typically, this will be the removal of water from a solution or suspension, such as the removal of water from fruit juice.

== Food ==
Relative to ready-to-drink beverages, concentrated forms of beverages are much smaller and lighter, and may have a longer shelf-life due to lower water activity.

=== Juice concentrate ===
A juice concentrate is the result of removing water from fruit or vegetable juice. Ready-to-drink juice may be manufactured from concentrate, which may be subject to government regulations to ensure food safety.

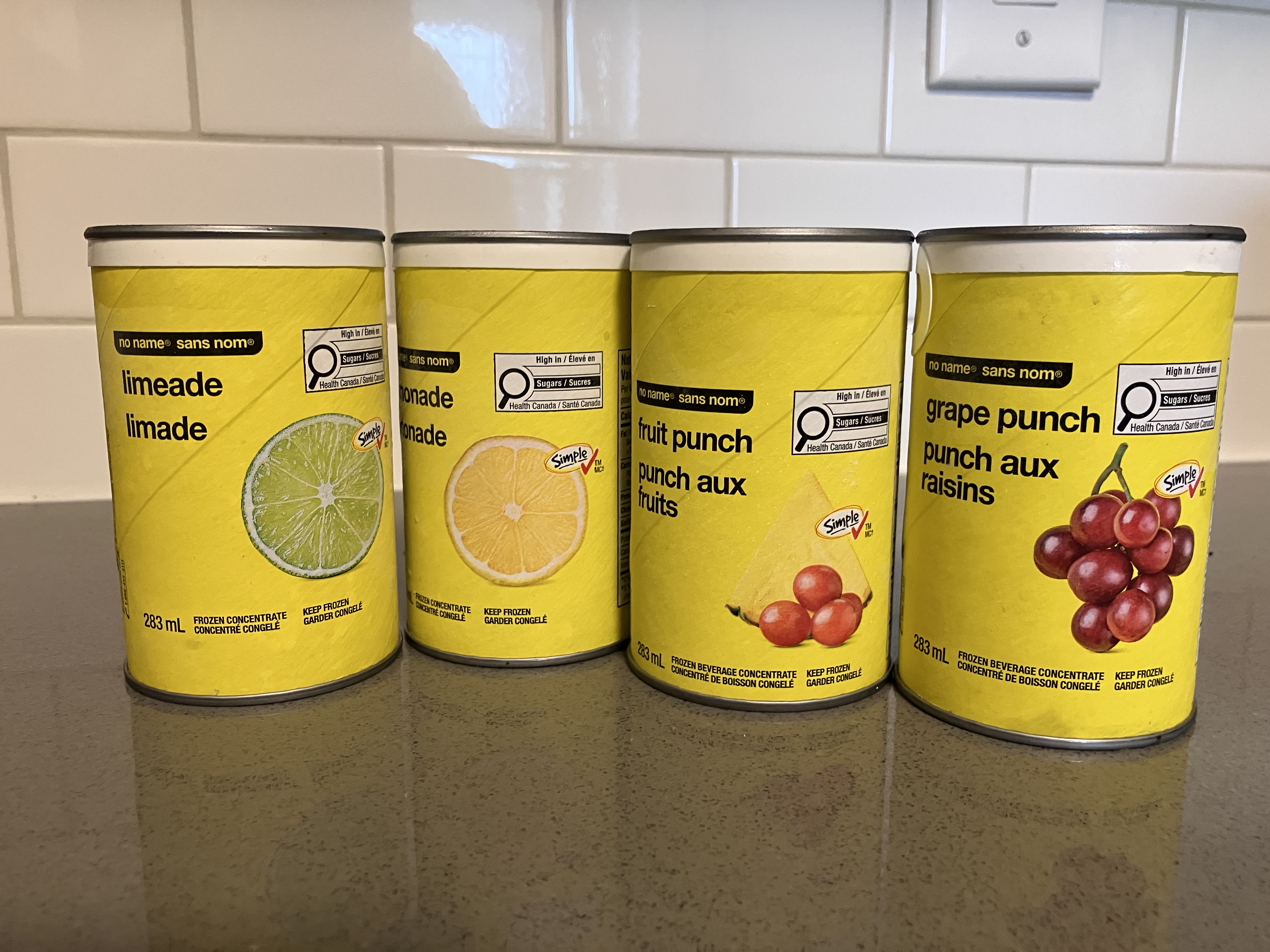
Frozen juice concentrate from Canada

A process of concentrating orange juice was patented in 1948. It was originally developed to provide World War II troops with a reliable source of vitamin C.

=== Soft drink concentrate ===
Most sodas and soft drinks are produced as highly concentrated syrups and later diluted with carbonated water directly before consumption or bottling.

=== Other food ===
Condensed milk is produced for transport weight savings and resistance to spoilage.

== See also ==
- Dairy Products
- Flavoring
