= Jelly bean rule =

Rule put forth by the U.S. Food and Drug Administration

The "jelly bean rule" is a rule put forth by the U.S. Food and Drug Administration (FDA) on May 19, 1994.

It says that just because foods are low in fat, cholesterol, and sodium, they cannot claim to be "healthy" unless they contain at least 10 percent of the Daily Value (DV) of: vitamin A, vitamin C, calcium, protein, fiber, or iron. The FDA also made a policy that companies could not fortify foods with the sole intent of making that claim.

== History ==
The Nutrition Labeling and Education Act (NLEA) is a United States Federal law that was signed in 1990. This law regulates nutrition labeling and nutrient content claims on foods regulated by the FDA. In 1993, health claim regulations were implemented to the NLEA. According to the NLEA, under 21 CFR §101.14(e)(6), the general criteria that all health claims had to meet were:

- Only information on the value that intake or reduced intake, as part of a total dietary pattern, may have on a disease or health-related condition
- Enables public to understand information provided and significance of information in the context of a total daily diet
- Complete, truthful, and not misleading
- Food contains, without fortification, 10 percent or more of the Daily Value of one of six nutrients (Dietary supplements excepted):
  - Vitamin A, 500 IU
  - Vitamin C, 6 mg
  - Iron, 1.8 mg
  - Calcium, 100 mg
  - Protein, 5 g
  - Fiber, 2.5 g

(Taken directly from Health Claims Chart)

The rule stating that food had to contain 10 percent DV without fortification of one of the six nutrients (Vitamin A, Vitamin C, Iron, Calcium, Protein, and Fiber) is commonly referred to as the "jelly bean rule".

In 1993, the FDA amended the Act, recognizing that it prohibited certain healthy foods from making important health claims. Foods such as fruits and vegetables, enriched grain products, and most breads were exempted from this rule. Another claim exempted from the "jelly bean rule" was the health claim that sugar alcohols could lead to dental cavities prevention.

== Coca-Cola ==
In 2009, the Center for Science in the Public Interest (CSPI), filed a lawsuit against The Coca-Cola Company for violating the Jelly Bean Rule. Coca-Cola was accused of making "deceptive and unsubstantiated claims" on its line of VitaminWater beverages. In the trial, the judge found the claims made on the packaging of VitaminWater to be misleading to consumers, leading them to believe that the consumption of the beverage would prevent disease, and provide general health. Examples of such statements can be found on the "defense" flavor, which says on its packaging "… this combination of zinc and fortifying vitamins can help out … and keep you healthy as a horse". The "focus" flavor says on its label that it contains vitamins and other nutrients that have been scientifically proven to reduce the risk of eye disease.

The name VitaminWater itself was found to be deceptive, as it leads consumers to believe that it contains only vitamins and water, while in fact it contains 33 grams of sugar per bottle. This is comparable to a can of Coca-Cola, which contains 39 grams of sugar. CSPI states that the harmful impact of the 33 grams of sugar, such as obesity, diabetes, and other conditions, easily outweighs the benefits of the nutrients added to VitaminWater. In defense, Coca-Cola argued that the nutritional label clearly showed the amount of sugar found in each bottle and that consumers could thus not be misled.

In 2010, Coca-Cola's motion to dismiss the lawsuit was denied. On April 7, 2016, the United States District Court for the Eastern District of New York gave its final approval to a settlement agreement barring Coca-Cola from making these health claims; in addition VitaminWater bottles will have to prominently display the words "with sweeteners" on their labels.
