= Etta James discography =

Cataloging of records by singer Etta James

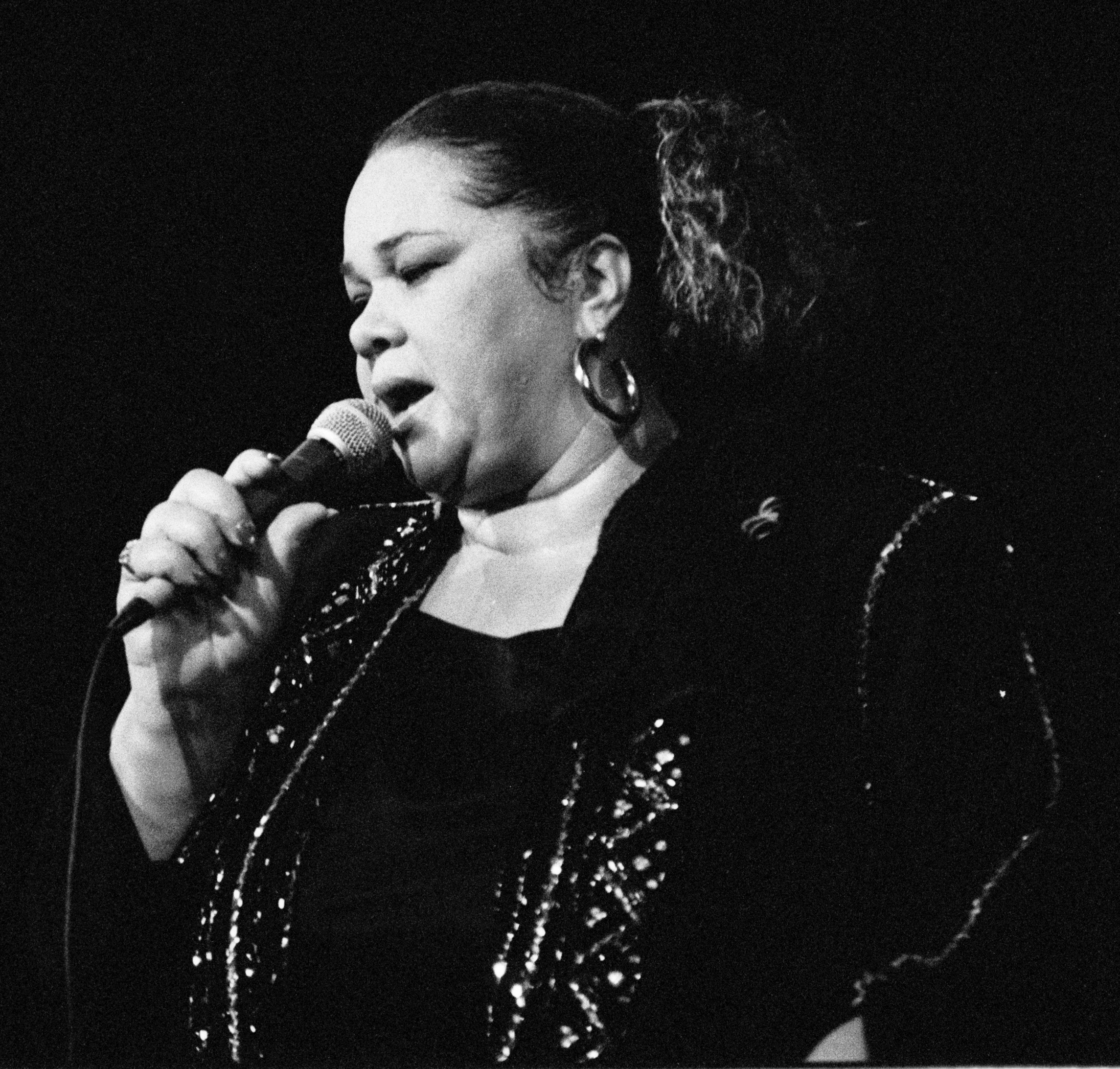
- James in 1990
- Studio albums: 30
- Live albums: 3
- Compilation albums: 6
- Tribute albums: 1
- Singles: 58
- No. 1 Singles (Overall): 1
- Other appearances: 28

The discography for the American singer Etta James consists of 29 studio albums, 3 live albums, and 12 compilations. She has also issued 58 singles, one of which, "The Wallflower (Dance with Me, Henry)," reached number 1 on the Rhythm and Blues Records chart in 1955.

As a teenager in San Francisco, California in the early 1950s, James formed a singing trio, which attracted the attention of Johnny Otis, who helped her sign a recording contract with Modern Records in 1954. She recorded "The Wallflower (Dance with Me, Henry)," an answer song to the Midnighters' "Work with Me, Annie," with her vocal group, the Peaches, singing background vocals, which topped the R&B charts for four weeks in 1955. The Peaches eventually left the label, and James recorded as a solo act. She had a second Top 10 hit, "Good Rockin' Daddy," in 1955. She recorded for Modern until the end of the decade, without much further success.

After beginning to date Harvey Fuqua, a singer for the Moonglows, James signed with Argo Records, a subsidiary of Chess Records. Producer Leonard Chess believed James had crossover potential in the pop market and backed her material with orchestral arrangements. With this new style, many of James's songs became hits on both the R&B and the pop charts, such as "All I Could Do Was Cry, "At Last," and "Trust in Me." She released her debut album, At Last!, in 1960. It was followed by The Second Time Around in 1961. In 1967, James recorded with a more soul-inflected style and had her first Top 10 hit in three years, "Tell Mama," which was followed by an album of the same name. In the 1970s, her popularity declined on radio, but she remained at Chess records, recording five albums for the label, departing from them with 1975's Etta Is Betta Than Evvah.

After battling drug and alcohol addictions, James returned with her first studio album in nine years in 1989 titled, Seven Year Itch on Island Records. Her two albums in the early 90s for Island and later Elektra, varied in style from contemporary to Soul, but James eventually settled in on the Private Music label. Recording a total of ten albums for the label between 1997 and 2002, her albums included variations of contemporary blues to traditional Jazz, such as her 1997 tribute album to Billie Holiday titled, Mystery Lady: Songs of Billie Holiday. In 2004, she signed with RCA Victor and released Blues to the Bone that same year, followed by a Pop standards release, All the Way, in 2006.

== Albums ==
=== Studio albums ===
Year	Album details	Peak chart positions			
Year	Album details	US	US R&B	US Blues	US Jazz
1960	At Last!: Released: November 15, 1960; Label: Argo LP-4003	68	—	—	—
1961	The Second Time Around: Released: 1961; Label: Argo LP-4011	—	—	—	—
1962	Etta James: Released: 1962; Label: Argo LP-4013	—	—	—	—
1962	Etta James Sings for Lovers: Released: 1962; Label: Argo LP-4018	—	—	—	—
1964	Queen of Soul: Released: December 5, 1964; Label: Argo LP-4040	—	—	—	—
1966	Call My Name: Released: 1966; Label: Cadet	—	—	—	—
1968	Tell Mama: Released: February, 1968; Label: Cadet	82	21	—	—
1970	Etta James Sings Funk: Released: 1970; Label: Cadet	—	—	—	—
1971	Losers Weepers: Released: 1971; Label: Cadet	—	—	—	—
1973	Etta James: Released: 1973; Label: Chess	154	41	—	—
1974	Come a Little Closer: Released: 1974; Label: Chess	—	47	—	—
1976	Etta Is Betta Than Evvah!: Released: 1976; Label: Chess	—	—	—	—
1978	Deep in the Night: Released: 1978; Label: Warner	—	—	—	—
1980	Changes: Released: 1980; Label: MCA	—	—	—	—
1989	Seven Year Itch: Released: 1989; Label: Island	—	—	—	—
1990	Stickin' to My Guns: Released: 1990; Label: Island	—	—	—	—
1992	The Right Time: Released: 1992; Label: Elektra	—	—	—	—
1994	Mystery Lady: Songs of Billie Holiday: Released: March 15, 1994; Label: Private Music	—	—	—	2
1995	Time After Time: Released: May 9, 1995; Label: Private Music	—	—	—	5
1997	Love's Been Rough on Me: Released: April 29, 1997; Label: Private Music	—	—	6	—
1998	Life, Love & the Blues: Released: June 30, 1998; Label: Private Music	—	—	3	—
1998	12 Songs of Christmas: Released: October 13, 1998; Label: Private Music	—	—	5	—
1999	Heart of a Woman: Released: June 29, 1999; Label: Private Music	—	—	4	—
2000	Matriarch of the Blues: Released: December 12, 2000; Label: Private Music	—	—	2	—
2001	Blue Gardenia: Released: August 21, 2001; Label: Private Music	—	—	—	1
2003	Let's Roll: Released: May 6, 2003; Label: Private Music	—	—	1	—
2004	Blues to the Bone: Released: June 8, 2004; Label: RCA Victor	—	—	4	—
2006	All the Way: Released: May 14, 2006; Label: RCA Victor	—	—	—	—
2011	The Dreamer: Released: November 8, 2011; Label: Verve Forecast	—	41	2	—
"—" denotes releases that did not chart.

=== Live albums ===
Year	Album details	Chart positions		
Year	Album details	US	US Blues	US Jazz
1964	Etta James Rocks the House: Released: 1964; Label: Argo LP-4032	96	—	—
1980	Etta, Red-Hot & Live: Released: 1982; Label: Quicksilver/Intermedia	—	—	—
1980	Blues From The Big Apple: Released: 2007; Label: Blues Boulevard 250177	—	—	—
1981	Live from San Francisco: Released: 1994; Label: On The Spot/Private Music	—	—	—
1986	Blues in the Night Volume One: The Early Show: Released: 1986; Label: Fantasy	—	—	10
1986	The Late Show: Blues in the Night Volume Two: Released: 1987; Label: Fantasy	—	—	—
1986	Jazzvisions: Jump The Blues Away: Released: 1989; Label: Verve	—	—	—
2001	Burnin' Down the House: Live at the House of Blues: Released: May 7, 2002; Label: Private Music	—	1	—
2022	Your Good Thing Live At Tipitina's Released 2022 Label: Tipitina's Record Club			
"—" denotes releases that did not chart.

=== Compilation albums ===
Year	Album details	Chart positions				Certifications (sales threshold)
Year	Album details	US	US Blues	US Jazz	UK	Certifications (sales threshold)
1962	Twist With Etta James: Released: 1962; Label: Crown 5250	—	—	—	—	
1963	Etta James Top Ten: Released: 1963; Label: Argo LP-4025	117	—	—	—	
1986	R&B Dynamite: Released: 1986; Label: Flair/Virgin	—	—	—	—	
1992	My Greatest Songs: Released: 1992; Label: MCA	—	—	—	—	
1997	Her Best: Released: 1997; Label: Chess	—	13	—	—	
1999	20th Century Masters: The Millennium Collection: Released: April 6, 1999; Label: MCA	32	3	—	—	US: Gold
2000	The Chess Box: Released: June 27, 2000; Label: Chess	—	—	—	—	
2000	The Best of Etta James: Released: September 25, 2000; Label: Spectrum	—	—	—	—	BPI: Gold
2001	Love Songs: Released: January 23, 2001; Label: MCA	—	2	—	—	
2005	Miss Etta James: The Complete Modern and Kent Recordings: Released: December 6, 2005; Label: Ace	—	—	—	—	
2006	The Definitive Collection: Released: January 10, 2006; Label: Geffen	—	1	—	—	
2007	Gold: Released: January 30, 2007; Label: Hip-O Records	—	—	—	—	
2010	At Last: The Best of Etta James: Released: September 17, 2010; Label: Decca Records	—	—	—	22	BPI: Gold
2011	Who's Blue?: Rare Chess Recordings of the 60s and 70s: Released: February 28, 2011; Label: Kent	—	—	—	—	
2011	Heart & Soul: A Retrospective: Released: October 18, 2011; Label: Hip-O Select	—	—	—	—	
2019	Collected: Released: June 14, 2019; Label: Universal Music	—	—	—	—	
"—" denotes releases that did not chart.

== Singles ==
Year	Song	Chart positions				Certifications	Album
Year	Song	US	US R&B	CAN	UK	Certifications	Album
1955	"The Wallflower (Dance with Me, Henry)"	—	1	—	—		Miss Etta James: The Complete Modern And Kent Recordings
1955	"Hey Henry"	—	—	—	—		Miss Etta James: The Complete Modern And Kent Recordings
1955	"Good Rockin' Daddy"	—	6	—	—		Miss Etta James: The Complete Modern And Kent Recordings
1955	"W-O-M-A-N"	—	—	—	—		Miss Etta James: The Complete Modern And Kent Recordings
1956	"My One and Only"	—	—	—	—		Miss Etta James: The Complete Modern And Kent Recordings
1956	"Shortnin' Bread Rock"	—	—	—	—		Miss Etta James: The Complete Modern And Kent Recordings
1956	"Tough Lover"	—	—	—	—		Miss Etta James: The Complete Modern And Kent Recordings
1956	"Good Lookin'"	—	—	—	—		Miss Etta James: The Complete Modern And Kent Recordings
1957	"The Pick-Up"	—	—	—	—		Miss Etta James: The Complete Modern And Kent Recordings
1957	"Come What May"	—	—	—	—		Miss Etta James: The Complete Modern And Kent Recordings
1958	"Sunshine of Love"	—	—	—	—		Miss Etta James: The Complete Modern And Kent Recordings
1959	"I Hope You're Satisfied" (with Harvey Fuqua)	—	—	—	—		Miss Etta James: The Complete Modern And Kent Recordings
1960	"If I Can't Have You" (with Harvey Fuqua)	52	6	—	—		Etta James
1960	"Spoonful" (with Harvey Fuqua)	78	12	—	—		Etta James
1960	"All I Could Do Was Cry"	33	2	—	—		At Last!
1960	"My Dearest Darling"	34	5	—	—		At Last!
1961	"At Last"	47	2	—	39	BPI: Platinum	At Last!
1961	"Trust in Me"	30	4	—	—		At Last!
1961	"Fool That I Am"	50	14	—	—		The Second Time Around
1961	"Don't Cry Baby"	39	6	—	—		The Second Time Around
1961	"Seven Day Fool"	95	—	—	—		The Second Time Around
1962	"Something's Got a Hold on Me"	37	4	—	—		Etta James / Etta James Top Ten
1962	"Stop the Wedding"	34	6	—	—		Etta James Top Ten
1962	"Fools Rush In" "Next Door to the Blues" (Non-album B side)	87 —	— 9	—	—		Etta James Sings for Lovers
1962	"Would It Make Any Difference to You"	64	—	—	—		Etta James Top Ten
1963	"Pushover"	25	7	—	—		Etta James Top Ten
1963	"Pay Back"	78	—	—	—		Non-album singles
1963	"Two Sides (To Every Story)"^{[A]}	63	—	—	—		Non-album singles
1964	"Baby What You Want Me to Do"	82	35	—	—		Queen of Soul
1964	"Loving You More Every Day"	65	7	—	—		Queen of Soul
1964	"Breaking Point"	—	—	—	—		Queen of Soul
1964	"Mellow Fellow"	—	34	—	—		Queen of Soul
1966	"Only Time Will Tell"	—	—	—	—		Non-album single
1967	"I Prefer You"	—	42	—	—		Call My Name
1967	"Don't Pick Me for Your Fool"	—	—	—	—		Call My Name
1967	"842-3089 (Call My Name)"	—	—	—	—		Call My Name
1967	"Tell Mama"	23	10	22	—		Tell Mama
1968	"Security"	35	11	46	—		Tell Mama
1968	"I Got You Babe"	69	32	46	—		Non-album singles
1968	"You Got It"	113	—	—	—		Non-album singles
1969	"Almost Persuaded"	79	32	71	—		Non-album singles
1969	"Miss Pitiful"	—	—	—	—		Non-album singles
1969	"Tighten Up Your Own Thing"	—	—	—	—		Etta James Sings Funk
1970	"Sound of Love"	—	—	—	—		Etta James Sings Funk
1970	"Losers, Weepers (Part 1)"	94	26	—	—		Losers, Weepers
1970	"The Love of My Man"	—	—	—	—		Losers, Weepers
1971	"I Think It's You"	—	—	—	—		Losers, Weepers
1972	"I Found a Love"	108	31	—	—		Non-album single
1973	"All the Way Down"	101	29	—	—		Etta James (1973)
1974	"You Can Leave Your Hat On"	—	76	—	—		Etta James (1973)
1974	"Out on the Street, Again"	—	84	—	—		Come a Little Closer
1976	"Jump Into Love"	—	92	—	—		Etta Is Betta Than Evah
1978	"Piece of My Heart"	—	93	—	—		Deep In the Night
1978	"Sugar on the Floor"	—	—	—	—		Deep In the Night
1980	"Mean Mother"	—	—	—	—		Changes
1961–1996	"I Just Want to Make Love to You"^{[B]}	—	—	—	5	BPI: Gold	The Genuine Article: The Best of Etta James
"—" denotes releases that did not chart.

=== Collaborations with Sugar Pie DeSanto ===
Year	Song	Chart positions		Album
Year	Song	US	US R&B	Album
1965	"Do I Make Myself Clear"	96	—	Non-album singles
1966	"In the Basement (Part 1)"	97	37	Non-album singles
"—" denotes releases that did not chart.

=== B-sides ===
Year	Song	Chart positions		Certifications	A-Side Single
Year	Song	US	US R&B	Certifications	A-Side Single
1961	"Dream"	55	—		"The Second Time Around"
1961	"A Sunday Kind of Love"	—	—		"Don't Cry Baby"
1961	"It's Too Soon to Know"	54	—		"Seven Day Fool"
1962	"Next Door to the Blues"	71	13		"Fools Rush In"
1963	"How Do You Speak to an Angel"	109	—		"Would It Make Any Difference to You"
1963	"I Worry 'Bout You"	118	—		"Two Sides (To Every Story)"
1967	"I'd Rather Go Blind"	—	—	BPI: Gold	"Tell Mama"
"—" denotes releases that did not chart.

- A Also peaked at No. 16 on the Hot Adult Contemporary Tracks chart.
- B Released outside of the United States.

== Other appearances ==
Year	Song	Album
1962	"The Wallflower (Dance with Me, Henry)"	Alan Freed's Top 15
1985	"The Wallflower (Dance with Me, Henry)"	Back to the Future (soundtrack)
1989	"At Last"	Rain Man (soundtrack)
1992	"The Wallflower (Dance with Me, Henry)"	Sister Act (soundtrack)
1993	"There's Something on Your Mind" (with B.B. King)	Blues Summit
1993	"Mockingbird" (with Taj Mahal)	Dancing the Blues
1995	"At Last"	Father of the Bride Part II (soundtrack)
1995	"At Last"	How to Make an American Quilt (soundtrack)
1995	"Take Me to the River" (with Wayne Jackson and Andrew Love)	The Memphis Horns with Special Guests
1996	"It's a Small World"/"When You Wish Upon a Star Medley"	Disney's Music from the Park
1997	"At Last"	Mad About You (soundtrack)
1998	"At Last"	Kissing a Fool (soundtrack)
1998	"At Last"	Living Out Loud (soundtrack)
1998	"The Man I Love"	Melrose Place Jazz: Upstairs at MP
1998	"At Last"	Pleasantville (soundtrack)
1998	"Next Door to the Blues"	Space Bunnies Must Die! (soundtrack)
1999	"Etta's Blues" (with Etta Jones)	Ain't She Sweet: Save Your Love for Me + I'll Be Seeing You
2000	"In the Basement (Part 1)"	The Hurricane (soundtrack)
2000	"The Nearness of You"	Music from the TV Series Frasier
2001	"I Just Wanna Make Love to You" (with Jimmy Smith)	Dot Com Blues
2001	"Only Time Will Tell"	Angel Eyes (soundtrack)
2001	"Gotta Serve Somebody"	The Songs of Bob Dylan, Vol. 2: May Your Song Always Be Sung
2002	"Ball 'n' Chain"	Janis Joplin: This Ain't No Tribute Series—All Blues'd Up!
2002	"Miss You" (Illicit Remix Edit)	Queer as Folk: The Second Season (soundtrack)
2005	"I'd Rather Go Blind" (with Dr. John)	A Night of Blistering Blues
2005	"Something's Got a Hold on Me" (with B.B. King)	A Night of Blistering Blues
2005	"In the Midnight Hour" (with Paul Butterfield, B.B. King, Chaka Khan, Gladys Knight, Billy Ocean, and Stevie Ray Vaughan)	A Night of Blistering Blues
2005	"Ain't Nobody's Business" (with Chaka Khan and Gladys Knight)	A Night of Blistering Blues
2005	"Take My Hand, Precious Lord" (with Chaka Khan and Gladys Knight)	A Night of Blistering Blues
2007	"Do Nothin' Till You Hear from Me"	We All Love Ella: Celebrating the First Lady of Song
