= Burnin' Down the House: Live at the House of Blues =

Live album by Etta James
- Released: May 7, 2002
- Genres: Blues, R&B
- Length: 72:52
- Label: Private Music
- Producer: John Snyder

Etta James chronology
Blue Gardenia (2001)	Burnin' Down the House: Live at the House of Blues (2002)	Let's Roll (2003)

Professional ratings
Review scores
Source	Rating
The Penguin Guide to Blues Recordings	2.5/4 stars

Burnin' Down the House: Live at the House of Blues is the third live album by Etta James and her twenty-eighth album overall, released in 2002. The album reached a peak position of number one on Billboard's Top Blues Albums chart.

A few of the cover songs on this album were also featured on some of James' past albums: Leave Your Hat On was on Etta James (1973), Your Good Thing Is About To End was on Stickin' to My Guns (1990), Rock Me Baby was on a previous live album Etta, Red-Hot & Live.

== Track listing ==
No.	Title	Writer(s)	Length
1.	"Introduction"		0:50
2.	"Come to Mama"	Willie Mitchell, Earl Randle	5:13
3.	"Medley: I Just Want To Make Love To You" / "Born to Be Wild"	Willie Dixon / Mars Bonfire	5:22
4.	"I'd Rather Go Blind"	Billy Foster, Ellington Jordan	6:21
5.	"All The Way Down"	Catherine Williamson, Gabe Mekler, Trevor Lawrence	6:30
6.	"At Last"	Mack Gordon, Harry Warren	4:44
7.	"Leave Your Hat On"	Randy Newman	5:33
8.	"Something's Got a Hold on Me"	Etta James, Leroy Kirkland, Pearl Woods	5:10
9.	"Your Good Thing Is About To End"	Isaac Hayes, David Porter	7:40
10.	"Rock Me Baby"		4:28
11.	"Medley: Love and Happiness / "Take Me to the River" / "My Funny Valentine"	Al Green, Mabon "Teenie" Hodges / Green, Hodges / Richard Rodgers, Lorenz Hart	9:57
12.	"Sugar on the Floor"	Kiki Dee	11:04
Total length:			72:52
