= Gold (compilation album) =

The title "Gold", in reference to a compilation album, may refer to:

== Universal Music Group albums and reissues ==
- Classic Rock Gold, a 2005 compilation
- Gold (The Allman Brothers Band album), a 2005 compilation
- Gold (Bachman–Turner Overdrive album), a 2005 compilation
- Gold (The Beautiful South album), a 2006 compilation
- Gold (Bob Marley and The Wailers album), a 2005 compilation
- Gold (Brian McKnight album), a 2007 compilation
- Gold (Cat Stevens album), a 2005 compilation
- Gold (Cher album), a 2005 compilation
- Gold (The Cranberries album), a 2008 compilation
- Gold (Cream album), a 2005 compilation
- Gold (Ella Fitzgerald album), a 2007 compilation
- Gold (Eric B. & Rakim album), a 2005 compilation
- Gold (Etta James album), a 2007 compilation
- Gold (Joe Cocker album), a 2006 compilation
- Gold (Lionel Richie album), a 2006 compilation
- Gold (The Moody Blues album), a 2005 compilation
- Gold (Olivia Newton-John album), a 2005 compilation
- Gold (Parliament album), a 2005 compilation
- Gold (Rush album), a 2006 compilation
- Gold (Scorpions album), a 2005 compilation
- Gold (Sublime album), a 2005 compilation
- Gold (Tears for Fears album), a 2006 compilation
- Gold (Traffic album), a 2005 compilation
- Gold (The Velvet Underground album), a 2005 compilation
- Gold, a 2006 reissue of Look of Love: The Very Best of ABC by ABC
- Gold, a 2019 reissue of Greatest Hits by Ace of Base
- Gold, a 2005 reissue of Young Lust: The Aerosmith Anthology by Aerosmith
- Gold, a 2006 reissue of Anthology by B. B. King
- Gold, a 2006 reissue of Intégrale des Enregistrements de: Boby Lapointe by Boby Lapointe
- Gold, a 2005 reissue of The Buddy Holly Collection by Buddy Holly
- Gold, a 2005 reissue of Anthology by Cameo
- Gold, a 2004 reissue of Gold: Greatest HIts by The Carpenters
- Gold, a 2005 reissue of Anthology by Chuck Berry
- Gold, a 2013 reissue of All the Best by Culture Club
- Gold, a 2005 reissue of The Donna Summer Anthology by Donna Summer
- Gold, a 2000 reissue of Anthology by Don Williams
- Gold, a 2006 reissue of Best of France Gall by France Gall
- Gold, a 2008 reissue of Two Feldman by François Feldman
- Gold, a 2013 reissue of All the Best of Gary Moore
- Gold, a 2005 reissue of The Ultimate Collection by Hank Williams
- Gold, a 2006 reissue of Les Années Barclay by Hugues Aufray
- Gold, a 2005 reissue of Anthology by The Jackson 5
- Gold, a 2005 reissue of The Sound of the Jam by The Jam
- Gold, a 2006 reissue of JB40 – 40th Anniversary Collection by James Brown
- Gold, a 2005 reissue of Love and Affection: Joan Armatrading Classics (1975–1983) by Joan Armatrading
- Gold, a 2008 reissue of This Is It! (The A&M Years 1979–1989) by Joe Jackson
- Gold, a 2007 reissue of The Island Years by John Cale
- Gold, a 2006 reissue of The Essential Lynyrd Skynyrd by Lynyrd Skynyrd
- Gold, a 2006 reissue of La Fille Aux Yeux D'or... by Marie Laforêt
- Gold, a 2008 reissue of Anthology by Michael Jackson
- Gold, a 2007 reissue of The Anthology: 1947–1972 by Muddy Waters
- Gold, a 2006 reissue of Les Triomphes de Nana Mouskouri by Nana Mouskouri
- Gold, a 2005 reissue of Anthology by Pete Townshend
- Gold, a 2007 reissue of Anthologia by Paco de Lucia
- Gold, a 2005 reissue of The Ultimate Collection by Patsy Cline
- Gold, a 2006 reissue of Moonlighting: The Anthology by Roger Daltrey
- Gold, a 2007 reissue of The Best of Siouxsie and the Banshees by Siouxsie and the Banshees
- Gold, a 2005 reissue of Whatever You Want – The Very Best of Status Quo by Status Quo
- Gold, a 2006 reissue of Come Sail Away – The Styx Anthology by Styx
- Gold, a 2008 compilation of Aaron Neville
- Gold, a 2005 compilation of Asia
- Gold, a 2008 compilation of Astrud Gilberto
- Gold, a 2008 compilation of Barry White
- Gold, a 2008 compilation of Bing Crosby
- Gold, a 2008 compilation of Bo Diddley
- Gold (1967–1972), a 2008 compilation of Bob Marley
- Gold, a 2008 compilation of Burning Spear
- Gold, a 2007 compilation of Chris de Burgh
- Gold, a 2006 compilation of Cinderella
- Gold, a 2006 compilation of Claude François
- Gold, a 2005 compilation of Commodores
- Gold, a 2005 compilation of Connie Francis
- Gold, a 2006 compilation of Conway Twitty
- Gold, a 2013 compilation of Crowded House
- Gold, a 2007 compilation of The Crusaders
- Gold, a 2007 compilation of Dinah Washington
- Gold, a 2008 compilation of Dusty Springfield
- Gold, a 2005 compilation of Engelbert Humperdinck
- Gold, a 2005 compilation of Four Tops
- Gold, a 2006 compilation of Frankie Ruiz
- Gold, a 2006 compilation of The Gap Band
- Gold, a 2006 compilation of Georges Moustaki
- Gold, a 2006 compilation of Gladys Knight & the Pips
- Gold, a 2006 compilation of Grover Washington Jr.
- Gold, a 2007 compilation of Jane Birkin
- Gold, a 2008 compilation of Jerry Lee Lewis
- Gold, a 2007 compilation of John Lee Hooker
- Gold, a 2007 compilation of JJ Cale
- Gold, a 2004 compilation of Kiss
- Gold, a 2005 compilation of Kool & the Gang
- Gold, a 2005 compilation of Level 42
- Gold, a 2006 compilation of Loretta Lynn
- Gold, a 2005 compilation of The Mamas & the Papas
- Gold, a 2006 compilation of Martha and the Vandellas
- Gold, a 2005 compilation of Marvin Gaye
- Gold, a 2006 compilation of The Mavericks
- Gold, a 2006 compilation of Michèle Torr
- Gold, a 2005 compilation of The Miracles
- Gold, a 2013 compilation of Nat King Cole
- Gold, a 2005 compilation of Neil Diamond
- Gold, a 2005 compilation of The Neville Brothers
- Gold, a 2005 compilation of New Edition
- Gold, a 2005 compilation of Nina Simone
- Gold, a 2007 compilation of The Oak Ridge Boys
- Gold, a 2008 compilation of Ohio Players
- Gold, a 2008 compilation of Oscar Peterson
- Gold, a 2005 compilation of Patti LaBelle
- Gold, a 2005 compilation of Peter Frampton
- Gold, a 2006 compilation of Poco
- Gold, a 2013 compilation of Poison
- Gold, a 2013 compilation of Public Image Ltd
- Gold, a 2005 compilation of Rick James
- Gold, a 2006 compilation of The Righteous Brothers
- Gold, a 2006 compilation of Robert Palmer
- Gold, a 2005 compilation of Rod Stewart
- Gold, a 2005 compilation of Roy Ayers
- Gold, a 2007 compilation of Sarah Vaughan
- Gold, a 2007 compilation of Serge Gainsbourg
- Gold, a 2006 compilation of Soraya
- Gold, a 2005 compilation of Squeeze
- Gold, a 2008 compilation of Stan Getz
- Gold, a 2006 compilation of The Statler Brothers
- Gold, a 2006 compilation of Stephanie Mills
- Gold, a 2005 compilation of Steppenwolf
- Gold, a 2006 compilation of The Style Council
- Gold, a 2005 compilation of The Supremes
- Gold, a 2005 compilation of The Temptations
- Gold, a 2008 compilation of Tesla
- Gold, a 2005 compilation of Them
- Gold, a 2005 compilation of Tom Jones
- Gold, a 2006 compilation of Tri Yann
- Gold, a 2006 compilation of Whitesnake
- Gold, a 2006 compilation of William Sheller

== Unrelated albums ==
- ABBA Gold, a 1992 compilation
- Gold, a 2019 compilation of Boney M.
- Gold (Earth, Wind & Fire album), a 2020 compilation. Part of a separate series of albums also titled "Gold"
- Gold (Jefferson Starship album), a 1979 compilation
- Gold, a 1974 compilation of John Lee Hooker
- Luv' Gold, a 1993 compilation
- Gold (September album), a 2008 compilation
- Gold, a 2004 compilation of Sonicflood
- Gold (Steely Dan album), a 1982 compilation (despite having a similar artwork, UMG's series started in the early 2000's.)
- Gold, a 2003 compilation of The Stranglers
- Retrospectacle – The Supertramp Anthology, an album reissued under Gold in the United States
- The Best of UFO: Gold Collection, a 1999 compilation
