= The Bayonets =

American band

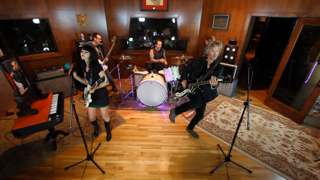

Background information
- Origin: Los Angeles, California
- Genres: Indie rock
- Years active: 2011–present
- Members: Brian Ray, Oliver Leiber
- Website: www.thebayonets.com

The Bayonets is an American independent rock band based in Los Angeles, California. Formed in 2011 by Brian Ray and Oliver Leiber after years of collaboration on Brian Ray's two solo albums, Mondo Magneto (2005) and This Way Up (2009). Oliver had the idea to form a band together, so they got together to write a series of singles for release throughout 2013, beginning on Valentine’s Day with the song "Sucker for Love" and followed three months later by "Smartphone". Stevie Van Zandt separately named both songs the "Coolest Song in the World" on "Little Steven's Underground Garage" radio show broadcast on terrestrial and satellite stations worldwide.

== Members and contributors ==
=== Brian Ray ===
Brian Ray is an American session musician, guitarist, bassist, singer–songwriter, and musical director. He is best known for his work as a rhythm, lead, and bass guitarist with Paul McCartney. Ray also spent 14 years and recorded several albums with Etta James.

=== Oliver Leiber ===
Oliver Leiber is a songwriter/producer who has been on the radio for 30 years, writing with artists such as Rod Stewart, Ke$ha, and The Corrs. Oliver Leiber is the son of Jerry Leiber of Leiber and Stoller, who wrote songs including "Hound Dog", "Jailhouse Rock", "Poison Ivy", "Charlie Brown", and "Stand By Me".

=== Other contributors ===
Lucrecia López Sanz (of Argentina's Nube 9) contributes lead and harmony vocals to the band's sound. Other musicians involved in The Bayonets include Scott Shriner (Weezer), Davey Faragher (Elvis Costello), Adam MacDougall (Black Crowes), and Larry Taylor (Tom Waits, Canned Heat). Steven Tyler (Aerosmith) offered harmony vocals and a bluesy harmonica solo to the song, "Vagabond Soul". The Bayonets record for Ray-O-Matic Records.

The Bayonets began recording the five singles at Brian Ray and Oliver Leiber's home studios in California in August 2012. Brian, Oliver, and Lucrecia also filmed a music video for the third single.

== Singles ==
=== "Sucker For Love" ===
The Bayonets' first single was released on February 14, 2013. A music video was also released in conjunction with Steven Van Zandt's radio edit and a wider radio release. The video was directed by Brian French and Linda Cevallos-French, and features both Brian and Oliver playing various characters. Brian likened the video to '1974 TV dating gameshows'. "Sucker For Love" did well in the music charts, entering at #19 and peaking at #9 on the Classic Rock radio chart between March 31 and April 6. The success of Sucker also made The Bayonets front page news in UK music magazine Clash. Capitalizing on the success of their debut single, the band decided to push back the release of their subsequent singles by seven weeks.

=== "Smartphone" ===
The second single "Smartphone" was released on May 18, 2013 via The Bayonets website. It was released two days later via iTunes. As with their first single, Steven Van Zandt named "Smartphone" the "Coolest Song in the World" on his SiriusXM radio show. While it was initially due to be released on April 23, Brian mentioned in late April that it may be released "a few days early".

=== "Vagabond Soul" ===
The third single "Vagabond Soul" was released on July 4 and features Aerosmith's Steven Tyler on backing vocals and harmonica. The track also features Davey Faragher on bass, Adam MacDougall on keyboard, Darrell Leonard on trumpet, Robert A. Martin on tenor saxophone and French horn, and Joe Sublett on baritone saxophone.

=== "Whatcha Got" and "Big Man Down" ===
The fourth and fifth singles were released on August 22, 2013. "Whatcha Got" features Lucrecia sharing lead vocals with Brian. It was performed at two shows during The Bayonets’ Tourette Del Sol 2 as well as being played on the Duro de Domar TV show.

"Big Man Down", also released on August 22, was available exclusively through The Bayonets website and was not made available through other digital download services.

== Crash Boom Bang! ==
Despite Brian's insistence that The Bayonets were a "one and done" band, only releasing singles, an LP titled Crash Boom Bang! was released on iTunes on July 29, 2014. The album consists of the five previously released singles along with five new songs, written specifically for the album. New song titles include "Crash Boom Bang!", "So Easy Rider", "Voodoo Doll", "Cotton Candy", and "Last Man Standing". A vinyl edition of Crash Boom Bang! was released in 2015 on the Lonestar Records label.

"Crash Boom Bang!" and "So Easy Rider" were released to the radio and both songs earned the title of "Coolest Song in the World" on "Little Steven's Underground Garage" radio show broadcast on terrestrial and satellite stations worldwide, bringing The Bayonets’ total of "Coolest Song's" to 5.

A live performance of six of the album's songs occurred at The Bayonets’ album release party on July 24, 2014, in Hollywood, California. Songs performed that night were: “Cotton Candy”, “Sucker For Love”, “Whatcha Got”, “Smartphone”, “So Easy Rider”, and “Crash Boom Bang”.

In November 2016 it was announced that The Bayonets had signed a new deal and will be re-releasing Crash Boom Bang! to a wider market. The re-release is due some time in early 2017.

== The Bayonets Live: Tourette del Sol 2 ==
In late April, 2013, The Bayonets confirmed that they would be playing shows in Buenos Aires, Argentina. They were backed by 60's cover band Nube 9, whose lineup also features Lucrecia López Sanz of The Bayonets. They played 4 shows at 3 venues: Faena Hotel, the MOD Club, and Mr. Jones Blues Bar. The tour was rounded off with a performance on the Duro de Domar TV show.

== Discography ==
Singles
Year	Title	Release date	Format
2013	"Sucker For Love"	February 13, 2013	Digital
2013	"Smartphone"	May 18, 2013	Digital
2013	"Vagabond Soul"	July 4, 2013	Digital
2013	"Whatcha Got"	August 22, 2013	Digital
2013	"Big Man Down"	August 22, 2013	Exclusive to website
2014	"Crash Boom Bang!"		Digital
2014	"So Easy Rider"		Radio Only
2015	"Christmas Time is Cruel"	December 11, 2015	Digital
2023	Argentina b/w Post Apocolyso	February 13, 2023	7-inch Single, Digital

Albums
Year	Title	Label	Format
2014	Crash Boom Bang!	Robo Records	Digital, CD, Vinyl
2017	Crash Boom Bang!	JEM Records	Digital, CD
