= Gold (Etta James album) =

Compilation album by Etta James
- Released: January 30, 2007
- Recorded: Various
- Genre: Blues, jazz, R&B, soul
- Length: 1hr, 56min
- Label: Hip-O Records/Chess Records
- Producer: Andy McKaie

Etta James chronology
Miss Etta James: The Complete Modern and Kent Recordings (2006)	Gold (2007)	Who's Blue?: Rare Chess Recordings of the 60s and 70s (2011)

Gold is a compilation album of 36 songs from Etta James. Unlike many collections, this two-disc album presents an overview of her work over five decades, rather than presenting a more in-depth look at the singer's heyday.

== Track listing ==
Disc 1

#	Song title	Length	Credit	Year
1	"The Wallflower"	2:59	Johnny Otis, Hank Ballard, Etta James	1955
2	"Good Rockin' Daddy"	2:25	Richard Berry, Joe Josea	1955
3	"Tough Lover"	2:10	Etta James, Joe Josea	1956
4	"All I Could Do Was Cry"	2:57	Billy Davis, Gwen Gordy Fuqua, Berry Gordy, Jr.	1960
5	"If I Can't Have You"	3:01	Harvey Fuqua, Etta James	1960
6	"My Dearest Darling"	3:04	Edwin "Eddie Bo" Bocage, Paul Gayten	1960
7	"A Sunday Kind of Love"	3:18	Barbara Belle, Anita Leonard, Louis Prima, Stan Rhodes	1961
8	"At Last"	3:01	Mack Gordon, Harry Warren	1961
9	"Trust in Me"	3:00	Milton Ager, Jean Schwartz, Ned Wever	1961
10	"Don't Cry Baby"	2:26	Saul Bernie, James Johnson, Stella Unger	1961
11	"Fool That I Am"	2:59	Floyd Hunt	1961
12	"Waiting for Charlie (to Come Home)"	2:08	Bob Hilliard, Burt Bacharach	1962
13	"Something's Got a Hold On Me"	2:50	Etta James, Leroy Kirkland, Pearl Woods	1962
14	"Next Door to the Blues"	2:49	Leroy Kirkland, Pearl Woods	1962
15	"Stop the Wedding"	2:52	Freddy Johnson, Kirkland, Woods	1962
16	"These Foolish Things (Remind Me of You)"	3:59	Jack Strachey, Harry Link, Eric "Holt Marvell" Maschwitz	1962
17	"Pushover"	2:56	Billy Davis, Tony Clarke	1963
18	"Baby What You Want Me to Do"	4:17	Jimmy Reed	1964

Disc 2

#	Song title	Length	Credit	Year
1	"Loving You More Every Day"	3:21	Mitchell	1964
2	"In the Basement (Part One)"	2:23	Davis, Raynard Miner, Smith	1966
3	"Tell Mama"	2:24	Clarence Carter, Marcus Daniel, Wilbur Terrell	1967
4	"I'd Rather Go Blind"	2:36	Bill Foster, Ellington Jordan	1968
5	"Security"	2:29	Otis Redding, Margaret Wessen	1968
6	"Almost Persuaded"	3:23	Bill Sherill, Glenn Sutton	1969
7	"Losers Weepers (Part One)"	3:00	Leon David Bonds	1970
8	"All the Way Down"	5:35	Trevor Lawrence, Gabriel Mekler, Catherine C. Williamson	1973
9	"God's Song (That's Why I Love Mankind)"	3:37	Randy Newman	-
10	"Feeling Uneasy"	2:48	Lawrence, Mekler	-
11	"Let's Burn Down the Cornfield"	3:43	Newman	-
12	"Loving Arms"	3:50	Tom Jans	1974
13	"Take it to the Limit"	4:06	Glenn Frey, Don Henley, Randy Meisner	-
14	"Damn Your Eyes"	4:11	Steve Bogard, Barbara Wyrick	1989
15	"Whatever Gets You Through the Night"	3:51	Bucky Lindsey, Dan Penn, Carson Whitsett	1990
16	"The Man I Love"	4:25	George & Ira Gershwin	1994
17	"The Blues is My Business"	3:32	Kevin Bowe, Todd Cerney	2003
18	"The Sky is Crying"	3:58	Morgan Robinson, Clarence Lewis, Elmore James	2004

== See also ==
- Etta James discography#Singles
