= Grady Champion =

American songwriter (born 1969)

- Born: October 10, 1969 (age 57); Canton, Mississippi, United States
- Genre: Electric blues
- Occupations: Harmonicist, singer, guitarist, and songwriter
- Instruments: Harmonica, guitar, vocals
- Years active: Late 1990s–present
- Website: Official website

Grady Champion (born October 10, 1969) is an American electric blues harmonicist, singer, guitarist and songwriter. He has released ten albums to date. His influences include Howlin' Wolf, Sonny Boy Williamson II, and Koko Taylor. His "rough, raspy vocals", complement his "authentic Mississippi juke joint blues and... modern ultra produced dance party soul and R&B".

AllMusic noted that "Champion, along with young innovators like Shemekia Copeland and Shawn Pittman, is one of the brighter beacons in the future of blues music".

== Biography ==
Champion was born in Canton, Mississippi, United States, the youngest of 28 children. He was raised on a farm in a religious household and joined his family's local church choir at the age of eight. At the age of 15 his family relocated to Miami, Florida, and Champion attended high school there for a year before the family moved back to Mississippi. After his graduation, Champion returned to Florida and worked as a boxer and radio DJ. Despite his initial background in both blues and gospel music, Champion began his professional career in the early 1990s as a rapper named MC Gold. Incorporating hip hop into a blues setting, Champion learned to play the harmonica before self-releasing his debut album, Goin' Back Home (1998).

He began playing clubs across Florida and was quickly signed to a recording contract by Shanachie Records. Tackling social issues in his self penned songs, including racial profiling and youth violence, Champion released Payin' for My Sins (1999) and 2 Days Short of a Week (2001) for the label. Champion's song, co-written with Kevin Bowe, entitled "Trust Yourself" was included on Etta James' Let's Roll album (2003). It won a Grammy Award for Best Contemporary Blues Album in 2003, and also a Blues Music Award as the 'Soul/Blues Album of the Year' from the Blues Foundation in 2004.

He won the 26th International Blues Challenge in 2010, and toured performing at the Chicago Blues Festival, on the Legendary Blues Cruise and at the Portland Waterfront Blues Festival. A triple threat performer, Champion moved back to Mississippi before releasing the live album, Back in Mississippi: Live at the 930 Blues Cafe in 2010. In 2011, Champion and his backing band performed at the Memphis in May event. Dreamin' followed and it was the No. 1 album on the Sirius XM's Bluesville chart, earning nominations in two categories for a Blues Music Award ('Best Soul Blues Album' and 'Song of the Year' for “Thank You for Giving Me the Blues"). Tough Times Don't Last, was released a year later.

Champion built his own recording facilities, Backyard Studio, beside his home in June 2014 and set up his own record label, D Champ Records, which has 2015 International Blues Challenge winner Eddie Cotton Jnr., and JJ Thames on its roster.

Champion was signed by Malaco, and issued Bootleg Whiskey in September 2014. He wrote or co-wrote five of the tracks on the album, while the title track was penned by George Jackson. Champion had the cover story in a 2014 edition of Living Blues.

== Discography ==
=== Albums ===
Album title	Record label	Year of release
Goin' Back Home	Gradyshady	1998
Payin' for My Sins	Shanachie	1999
2 Days Short of a Week	Shanachie	2001
Back in Mississippi: Live at the 930 Blues Cafe	Earwig	2008
Dreamin'	GSM Records	2011
Shanachie Days	Shanachie	2012
Tough Times Don't Last	Grady Shady Music	2012
Bootleg Whiskey	Malaco	2014
One of a Kind	Malaco	2016
Steppin' In	Malaco	2019

== See also ==
- List of electric blues musicians
- List of harmonica blues musicians
