= Blues to the Bone =

Studio album by Etta James
- Released: June 8, 2004
- Recorded: 2004
- Genre: Blues
- Length: 47:53
- Label: RCA Victor
- Producers: Etta James, Donto James, Josh Sklair, Sametto James

Etta James chronology
Let's Roll (2003)	Blues to the Bone (2004)	All the Way (2006)

Blues to the Bone is the twenty-seventh studio album by Etta James. The album contains a selection of twelve blues standards which are among her favourites. James and her sons Donto and Sametto James produced the album with Josh Sklair, which reached number four in the Billboard Top Blues chart.

The album was given a Grammy Award in 2005 for Best Traditional Blues Album.

== Critical reception ==
Professional ratings
Review scores
Source	Rating
AllMusic	4/5 stars
The Penguin Guide to Blues Recordings	2.5/4 stars

AllMusic gave the album a rating of four out of five, calling it "a solid album of no-frills, gutbucket performances".

== Track listing ==
1. "I Got My Mojo Working" (Preston Foster) – 3:34
2. "Don't Start Me to Talking" (Sonny Boy Williamson II) – 2:52
3. "Hush Hush" (Jimmy Reed) – 3:34
4. "Lil' Red Rooster" (Willie Dixon) – 3:54
5. "That's Alright" (Jimmy Rogers) – 3:42
6. "Crawlin' King Snake" (John Lee Hooker) – 5:32
7. "Dust My Broom" (Robert Johnson) – 3:35
8. "The Sky Is Crying" (Elmore James) – 3:59
9. "Smokestack Lightnin'" (Howlin' Wolf) – 6:50
10. "You Shook Me" (Dixon, J. B. Lenoir) – 3:51
11. "Driving Wheel" (Roosevelt Sykes) – 2:59
12. "Honey, Don't Tear My Clothes" (Lightnin' Hopkins) – 3:31

== Personnel ==
- Etta James – vocals
- John "Juke" Logan – harmonica
- Josh Sklair – producer, arranger, guitar, Dobro
- Bobby Murray – guitars
- Brian Ray – guitar, slideguitar
- Sametto James – bass
- Donto Metto James – drums
- Mike Finnigan – piano
