= Mondo Magneto =

Studio album by Brian Ray
- Released: 17 October 2006
- Genre: Indie rock
- Length: 37:53
- Label: Whooray Records
- Producer: Brian Ray; Oliver Leiber; David Gamson

Mondo Magneto is the debut studio rock album by Brian Ray, released on October 16, 2006 through his independent record label Whooray Records.

== Background ==
After decades of performing, writing and recording with musical artists, Brian Ray, a guitarist/songwriter/singer/producer released his first solo album, Mondo Magneto. "People have always asked me when I was going to do my own thing," Ray said, "I guess I was just busy."

Unlike other albums, Mondo Magneto was recorded on analog, then moved over to digital for further editing.

When he asked the blues singer Etta James if she would sing with him on the album her answer was simple - and immediate - "I'll do anything for Brian."

Musicians on Mondo Magneto include Scott Shriner from Weezer, Davey Faragher from Elvis Costello's band, as well as Abe Laboriel, Jr., Wix Wickens and Rusty Anderson from Paul McCartney's band. The record release party was held at The Mint in Los Angeles, California on January 21, 2006.

== Track listing ==
1. Good For Nothing - 3:21 (Brian Ray)

- Brian Ray - Vocals, Harmonies, Electric Guitars, Omnicord
- Matt Laug - Drums
- Scott Shriner - Backing Vocals
- Abe Laboriel Jr. - Backing Vocals, Tambourine
- Oliver Leiber - Roland CR-8000

2. Vinyl - 3:35 (Brian Ray/Oliver Leiber)

- Brian Ray - Vocals, Guitar, Slide Guitar
- Abe Laboriel Jr. - Drums, Backing Vocals
- Paul Bushnell - Bass Guitar, Backing Vocals
- Matt Laug - Tambourine

3. Goin’ Down Swingin’ - 3:52 (Brian Ray/Oliver Leiber/David Gamson)

- Brian Ray - Vocals, Backing Vocals, Guitar, Maracas
- Oliver Leiber - Drums, Guitar, Maracas
- David Gamson - Bass Guitar, Programming

4.Soft Machine (Featuring Etta James) - 4:01 (Brian Ray/Tonio K./Steve LeGassick)

- Brian Ray - Vocals, Guitar
- Matt Laug - Drums, Percussion
- David Gamson - Bass Guitar, Backing Vocals

5. I Liked You Better - 3:18 (Brian Ray/Adam Cohen/Oliver Leiber)

- Brian Ray - Vocals, Guitar
- Matt Laug - Drums, Percussion
- David Gamson - Bass Guitar, Backing Vocals
- Russ Irwin - Backing Vocals
- Jason Paige - Backing Vocals

6. All I Know - 4:27 (Brian Ray)

- Brian Ray - Vocals, Harmonies, Guitar, Slide Guitar
- Paul "Wix" Wickens - Mellotron
- Rusty Anderson - Pedal Steel Guitar
- Joe Zook - Tambourine
- Scott Shriner - Bass Guitar, Backing Vocals
- Abe Laboriel Jr. - Drums, Backing Vocals

7. Coming Up Roses - 3:54 (Brian Ray/Tonio K.)

- Brian Ray - Vocals, Guitar
- Abe Laboriel Jr. - Drums, Percussion
- Paul Bushnell - Bass Guitar
- Scott Shriner - Backing Vocals
- David Gamson - Backing Vocals
- The Dirt Brothers - Metal Vocals

8. Sub Atomic - 3:35 (Brian Ray/Abe Laboriel Jr.)

- Brian Ray - Vocals, Backing Vocals, Guitar
- Abe Laboriel Jr. - Drums, Tambourine
- Scott Shriner - Bass Guitar

9. If You’re Leaving Me 3:45 (Brian Ray)

- Brian Ray - Vocals, Acoustic Guitar, Percussion
- Russ Irwin - String Arrangement, Strings, Mellotron, Organ

10. Anywhere But Home - 4:09 (Brian Ray)

- Brian Ray - Vocals, Guitar
- Matt Laug - Drums, Percussion
- Scott Shriner - Backing Vocals
- Abe Laboriel Jr. - Backing Vocals
- David Gamson - Bass Guitar
