= Payin' for My Sins =

Studio album by Grady Champion
- Released: 1999
- Studio: Dog House
- Genre: Blues
- Label: Shanachie
- Producer: Dennis Walker

Grady Champion chronology
Goin' Back Home (1998)	Payin' for My Sins (1999)	2 Days Short of a Week (2001)

Payin' for My Sins is an album by the American musician Grady Champion, released in 1999. It was his first album for Shanachie Records. Champion supported the album with a North American tour.

== Production ==
The album was produced by Dennis Walker. Champion cowrote or wrote eight of its songs. Alan Mirikitani contributed on lead guitar. "Don't Start Me Talkin'" is a version of the Sonny Boy Williamson II song. "She's Some Kind of Wonderful" is a cover of the Soul Brothers Six song. "Goin' Down Slow" uses the music of the Jimmy Oden song to relate a story of a cousin succumbing to AIDS.

== Critical reception ==
Professional ratings
Review scores
Source	Rating
AllMusic	3/5 stars
The Penguin Guide to Blues Recordings	4/4 stars
The Philadelphia Inquirer	3.5/4 stars
Pittsburgh Post-Gazette	3/4 stars

The Pittsburgh Post-Gazette wrote that "Champion's strengths in this sometimes funky, always soulful outing, are his strong vocals and songwriting skills, in which he blends his urbane vision into a traditional style." The Independent opined that the production gives the "material a subtlety and classiness not shared by much of the competition." The Philadelphia Inquirer concluded that "you can hear echoes of [Robert] Cray in tracks such as 'You Got Some Explaining to Do', with its tension between the pointed lyrics and smooth, horns-and-organ groove... But his engagingly robust and reedy voice gives Champion a commanding presence of his own." The Clarion-Ledger opined that "Champion's gravely voice and more than capable harmonica make this a very entertaining album." The Star Tribune deemed Payin' for My Sins "one of 1999's most stirring blues platters."

AllMusic said that Champion's "voice is rough, more a shouter and screamer than a trained singer, sandpaper over silk, with imprecise phrasings."

== Track listing ==
No.	Title	Length
1.	"I'm Smilin' Again"
2.	"You Got Some Explaining to Do"
3.	"Good as New"
4.	"She's Some Kind of Wonderful"
5.	"My Rooster Is King"
6.	"Goin' Down Slow"
7.	"Payin' for My Sins"
8.	"Troubled Mind"
9.	"Let Me Be"
10.	"Roberta"
11.	"Don't Start Me Talkin'"
12.	"Ain't No Love in the Heart of the City"
13.	"Dreamin'"
