= Sound of Love (song) =

Song by Bee Gees

from the album Odessa
- Released: March 1969
- Recorded: 20 August 1968 (Atlantic Studios); November 1968 (IBC Studios)
- Length: 3:27
- Label: Polydor; Atco (United States/Canada)
- Songwriter: Barry, Robin & Maurice Gibb
- Producers: Robert Stigwood, Bee Gees

"Sound of Love" is a ballad number performed by the Bee Gees, It was written by Barry, Robin & Maurice Gibb, and appeared on their album Odessa in 1969.

== Background ==
It was originally recorded at Atlantic Studios, New York City on August 20, 1968, and was finished at IBC Studios, London in November of that year. A mix with the original vocal take appears on the Sketches for Odessa disc released with the remastered edition in 2009. The song starts with a piano introduction from Maurice Gibb, the bass and drums come in at 0:37. The orchestra was conducted by Bill Shepherd, with a powerfully-sung lead vocal from Barry Gibb.

== Personnel ==
- Barry Gibb — lead vocal, guitar
- Maurice Gibb — piano, bass, guitar
- Vince Melouney — guitar
- Colin Petersen — drums
- Bill Shepherd — orchestral arrangement

== Cover versions ==
- Etta James recorded this song and released on her 1970 album Etta James Sings Funk. The version was arranged by Gene Barge and produced by Barge and Ralph Bass, and James' version was released as the B-side of "When I Stop Dreaming" on Cadet Records.
- The Sandpipers recorded this song on their Come Saturday Morning album also in 1970 on A&M Records.
