= Brian Ray =

American musician (born 1955)

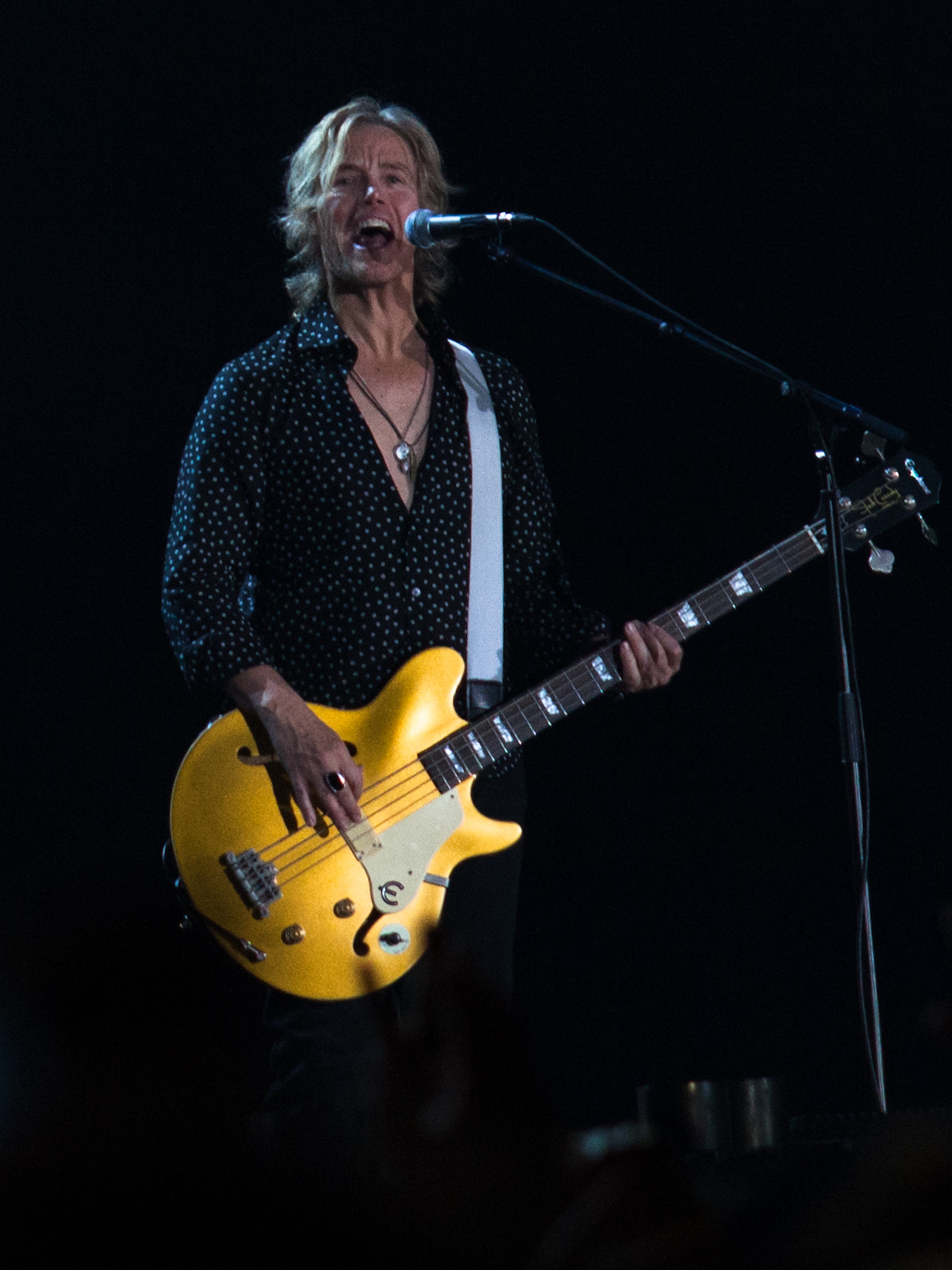
- Ray performing with Paul McCartney in 2012

Background information
- Born: Brian Thomas Ray; January 4, 1955 (age 71)
- Origin: California, U.S.
- Genres: Rock; pop
- Occupation: Musician
- Instruments: Guitar, bass, vocals
- Years active: 1972–present
- Member of: The Bayonets
- Website: brianray.com

Brian Thomas Ray (born January 4, 1955) is an American musician best known as a guitarist, bassist and backing vocalist with Paul McCartney's touring band since 2002, and formerly as a musical director and guitarist for Etta James. Ray has performed with numerous other artists and leads his own band, The Bayonets.

== Early life ==
Brian Ray grew up in Southern California. His first musical performances were in front of his peers – at show and tell – setting his own lyrics to the tune of old folk songs.

By the age of nine, he began playing the guitar. His elder sister, Jean (of folk duo Jim and Jean) spurred his interest in rock music through her record collection. Jean invited Brian to play at the LA Troubadour when he was 15 years old. She was "probably the most important and influential person" in Ray's early life.

== Career ==
In 1973, shortly after graduating from high school, Ray began his musical career as part of Bobby Pickett and the Crypt Kicker Five, playing "Monster Mash" at a fundraising benefit hosted by and for Phil Kaufman. Kaufman took Ray in and would later introduce him to singer Etta James at a rehearsal for the world-famous Troubadour, just as James was on the brink of a career comeback. That brief introduction would eventually lead to Ray's 14-year career as Etta James' musical director and guitarist.

While working for Etta James, Ray also shared stages with musicians such as Keith Richards, Santana, Joe Cocker, Bonnie Raitt, John Lee Hooker, and Bo Diddley. At this time he also began focusing more on songwriting. Ray spent the late 1980s collaborating with musicians such as Peter Frampton, Rita Coolidge, Nicolette Larson, Michael Steele (of The Bangles), and Steve LeGassick, who became a songwriting partner for 13 years. It was this songwriting partnership with LeGassick that would create the 1987 Smokey Robinson award-winning hit "One Heartbeat", which has received over 2,000,000 airplays.

Prior to working with Paul McCartney in 2002, Ray was working on tour in France with two different French artists, Mylène Farmer and Johnny Hallyday. Abe Laboriel Jr., a drummer who had previously worked with Brian Ray, mentioned that Paul McCartney was in search of a guitarist who could switch between guitar and bass guitar (for songs on which McCartney plays piano or guitar). After meeting with McCartney's producer for Driving Rain, David Kahne, Ray joined Paul McCartney for the pre-game performance of "Freedom" at the NFL's Super Bowl XXXVI in 2002.

Ray joined the rest of Paul McCartney's band for the Driving Rain tour in promotion of the album. As of then, he has appeared on McCartney's solo albums, such as Back in the World, Back in the U.S., Memory Almost Full, New and Egypt Station as well as three concert DVDs: Paul McCartney in Red Square, The Space Within US, and Good Evening New York City.

In addition to being a session musician, Brian Ray has also contributed to film scores such as the soundtrack to the film Heartbreakers in 1984. In 2002, Ray and Abe Laboriel Jr. composed the score for the independent film The Failures. In 2011, Ray joined with Oliver Leiber to form The Bayonets.

=== Solo career ===
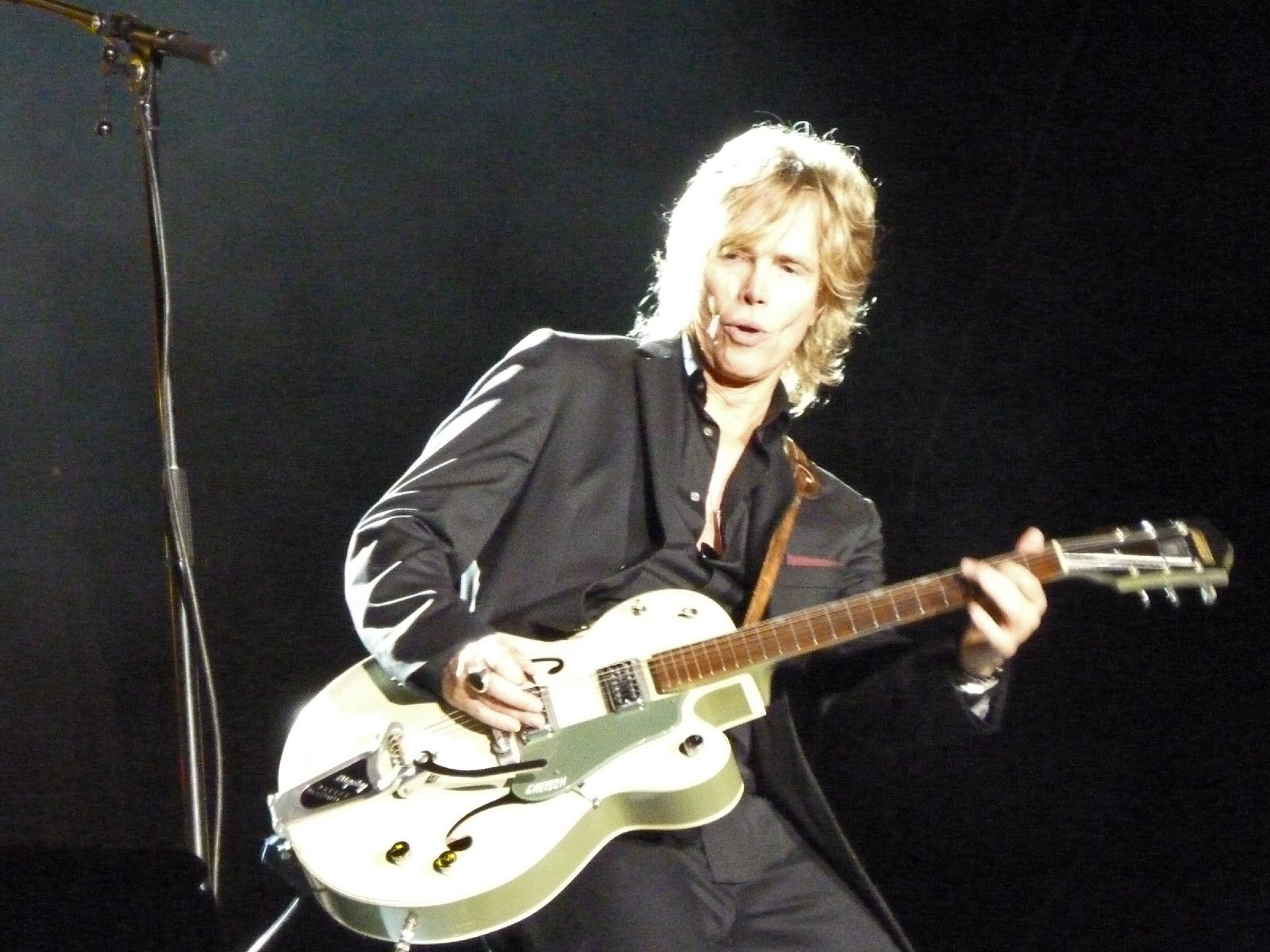
Ray performing in 2010

After decades of performing, writing, and recording with musical artists, Brian Ray released his first solo album, Mondo Magneto, on October 16, 2006, through his record label Whooray Records.

"People have always asked me when I was going to do my own thing", Ray said, "I guess I was just busy."

Musicians on Mondo Magneto include Scott Shriner from Weezer, Davey Faragher from Elvis Costello's band, as well as Abe Laboriel, Jr., Wix Wickens, and Rusty Anderson from Paul McCartney's band.

When Ray asked the blues singer and his former boss Etta James if she would sing with him on the album her answer was simple, and immediate – "I'll do anything for Brian."

Mondo Magneto's record release party was held at The Mint in Los Angeles, California, on January 21, 2006. Ray's live band, Black Unicorn, includes musicians Peter Thorn on guitar, Jon Button on bass, and Matt Laug on drums. The band performs their music in Los Angeles clubs, such as The Viper Room and The Mint.

In 2008, Larry Graves and Brian Ray made a video for Ray's song "Coming Up Roses".

In 2010, Ray released a second album, entitled This Way Up.

== Discography ==
Year	Album	Artist	Notes
1976	Etta Is Betta Than Evvah!	Etta James	
1977	Crackin'	Crackin'	
1978	The Reggie Knighton Band	The Reggie Knighton Band	
1978	Deep in the Night	Etta James	
1981	Hot Spot	Steve Goodman	
1986	Friends and Lovers	Gloria Loring	
1987	One Heartbeat	Smokey Robinson	Co-writer, arranger, programming, guitars on recording with Smokey Robinson
1989	Joy	Crystal Lewis	
1992	Backstreets of Desire	Willy DeVille	
1992	Love Lessons	Rita Coolidge	Writer, arranger, producer
1992	Something Real	Stephanie Mills	
1994	Live from San Francisco	Etta James	Live album; co- producer and music director, guitars
1995	Loup Garou	Willy DeVille	
1995	Behind the Memories	Rita Coolidge	
1996	Greatest Hits	Brenda Russell	Writer, producer, guitars
1998	Johnny allume le feu au Stade de France	Johnny Hallyday	Live Album; guitars
2000	100% Johnny Live à la Tour Eiffel	Johnny Hallyday	Live Album; guitars
2001	Laundry Service	Shakira	Guitars (Mis-Credited as Bryan Ray on Liner Notes)
2002	Back in the U.S.	Paul McCartney	Live album and DVD; bass, electric guitars, acoustic guitar
2003	Back in the World	Paul McCartney	Live Album; bass, electric guitars, acoustic guitar
2004	Blues to the Bone	Etta James	
2005	Paul McCartney in Red Square	Paul McCartney	Live DVD; bass, electric guitars, acoustic guitar
2005	Chaos and Creation in the Backyard	Paul McCartney	
2005	Mondo Magneto	Brian Ray	Debut solo album
2005	Undressing Underwater	Rusty Anderson	
2006	The Space Within US	Paul McCartney	Live DVD; electric guitars, bass, acoustic guitar
2006	Le coeur d'un homme	Johnny Hallyday	Guitars
2007	Memory Almost Full	Paul McCartney	
2008	Pistola	Willy DeVille	
2008	Ca ne finira jamais	Johnny Hallyday	
2009	Good Evening New York City	Paul McCartney	Live DVD; bass guitar, electric guitars, acoustic guitar
2009	All I Ever Wanted	Kelly Clarkson	guitar
2010	This Way Up	Brian Ray	Solo album
2013	New	Paul McCartney	
2014	Loco de Amor	Juanes	
2014	Be Here Then	Stephen Bishop	
2014	Crash Boom Bang!	The Bayonets	
2018	Egypt Station	Paul McCartney	
2024	My Town	Brian Ray	Solo album

== See also ==
- The Bayonets
