= Changes (Etta James album) =

Studio album by Etta James
- Released: 1980
- Genre: Funk, soul, disco
- Label: MCA
- Producer: Allen Toussaint

Etta James chronology
Deep in the Night (1978)	Changes (1980)	Etta, Red-Hot & Live (1982)

Changes is the fourteenth studio album by Etta James, released in 1980. It was recorded at the Sea-Saint studios in New Orleans, with Allen Toussaint arranging and producing, as well as contributing four songs. The album was first released on compact disc in 2014 by Fuel 2000, under the title The Allen Toussaint Sessions - It Takes Love To Keep A Woman. The album received a second, digital-only release by Gulf Coast Records in 2016 as New Orleans Sessions.

== Track listing ==
No.	Title	Writer(s)	Length
1.	"Mean Mother"	Willie Hutch	4:33
2.	"Donkey"	Hutch	3:18
3.	"Changes"	Carol L. King, Jimmy Lewis	4:00
4.	"Don't Stop"	Toussaint	3:23
5.	"Who's Getting Your Love"	Hutch	3:33
6.	"Night By Night"	Jimmy Jules	3:15
7.	"It Takes Love to Keep a Woman"	Pat Livingston, Bonnie White	4:10
8.	"Wheel of Fire"	Toussaint	3:32
9.	"Night People"	Toussaint	4:44
10.	"With You in Mind"	Toussaint	4:21
Total length:			39:13

== Personnel ==
- Vocals: Etta James
- Guitar: Steve Hughes, Leo Nocentelli
- Bass: Tony Broussard
- Keyboards: Robert Dabon, Sam Henry
- Drums: Herman "Roscoe" Ernest III
- Percussion: Kenneth Williams
