= All the Way (Etta James album) =

Studio album by Etta James
- Released: March 14, 2006
- Recorded: 2005
- Genre: R&B
- Label: RCA Victor
- Producer: Etta James

Etta James chronology
Blues to the Bone (2004)	All the Way (2006)	The Dreamer (2011)

Professional ratings
Review scores
Source	Rating
AllMusic	2.5/5 stars

All the Way is the twenty-eighth studio album recorded by American R&B singer Etta James, released on the RCA Victor record label. It contains 11 covers of songs that were hand-picked by James, who also served as executive producer on the album.

== Composition ==
Originally conceived under the working title, Hope for a Miracle, production of All the Way began a year after James released Blues to the Bone, her twenty-seventh album. Although her record label, RCA Victor, advised her to "leave the blues alone for a while and do something lush", she was otherwise given full creative control over the album and song choices — a first in her fifty-three-year career.

James chose songs that were written by, and originally performed by male singers. The first song revealed for the album was Frank Sinatra's All the Way, which would become the album's title track. All other tracks were kept secret until the album's eventual release.

The album was originally planned for release in October 2005, but was delayed until March 14, 2006 for unknown reasons.

== Track listing ==
1. "All the Way" (Sammy Cahn, Jimmy Van Heusen) – 3:37
2. "Stop On By" (Thomas Truman, Bobby Womack) – 4:08
3. "Strung Out" (Johnny Watson) – 7:12
4. "Somewhere" (Leonard Bernstein, Stephen Sondheim) – 2:15
5. "Holding Back the Years" (Michael James Hucknall, Neil Moss) – 4:18
6. "Imagine" (John Lennon) – 3:39
7. "I Believe I Can Fly" (R. Kelly) – 5:10
8. "It's a Man's Man's Man's World" (James Brown, Betty Newsome) – 4:53
9. "Purple Rain" (Prince) – 5:45
10. "What's Going On" (Renaldo Benson, Al Cleveland, Marvin Gaye) – 4:27
11. "Calling You" (Robert E. Telson) – 6:14
