= Queen of Soul (album) =

Studio album by Etta James
- Released: December 5, 1964
- Genre: Blues; R&B; soul
- Label: Argo
- Producer: Leonard Chess

Etta James chronology
Etta James Rocks the House (1963)	Queen of Soul (1964)	Call My Name (1967)

Professional ratings
Review scores
Source	Rating
Allmusic	4/5 stars

Queen of Soul is the fifth studio album by American blues artist, Etta James. The album was released on Argo Records in December 1964, featuring the singles James had released during the year. It was arranged by Riley Hampton, Bert Keyes, Cliff Parman, Al Pokonka and Phil Wright.

Two songs on the album: "Baby What You Want Me to Do" and "Loving You More Every Day" charted on the Rhythm and Blues and Billboard Pop Chart. It was James's first studio album in two years since the release of Etta James Top Ten. It consisted of ten tracks, with five on each side of the LP.

Allmusic rated the album four out of five stars.

== Track listing ==
Side one

1. "Bobby Is His Name" (Etta James, Ed Townsend)
2. "I Wish Someone Would Care" (Irma Thomas)
3. "That Man Belongs Back Here with Me" (Angela Riela, Clint Ballard Jr.)
4. "Somewhere Out There" (Billy Davis, Carl Smith, Wilfred McKinley)
5. "Breaking Point" (Maurice McAlister)

Side two

6. "Flight 101" (Cathy Lynn, Robert Higginbotham)
7. "Loving You More Every Day" (Ronnie Mitchell)
8. "Do Right" (Fred Johnson, Leroy Kirkland, Pearl Woods)
9. "I Worry 'Bout You" (Norman Mapp)
10. "Mello Fellow" (Ed Townsend)
