= Losers Weepers =

Studio album by Etta James
- Released: 1971
- Genre: Funk, soul
- Label: Cadet
- Producer: Ralph Bass

Etta James chronology
Etta James Sings Funk (1970)	Losers Weepers (1971)	Etta James (1973)

Professional ratings
Review scores
Source	Rating
AllMusic	4/5 stars
Christgau's Record Guide	B+
The Encyclopedia of Popular Music	3/5 stars

Losers Weepers is the ninth studio album by the American blues artist Etta James, released in 1971.

The title track peaked at No. 94 on the Billboard Hot 100.

== Critical reception ==
Music Week wrote that "although [James] was in a bad way with narcotics addiction at the time, she turns in some formidable genre-defying vocals encompassing blues, R&B, jazz and deep soul."

== Track listing ==
No.	Title	Writer(s)	Length
1.	"Take Out Some Insurance"	Leon David Bonds	2:58
2.	"I Got It Bad and That Ain't Good"	Duke Ellington, Paul Webster	4:30
3.	"I Think It's You"	Gene Barge	3:56
4.	"Someone"	George Soule, Richard Cherry	3:50
5.	"Losers Weepers"	Bonds	2:33
6.	"Weepers"	Bonds, Barge	2:33
7.	"You're the Fool"	Sharon McMahan	2:40
8.	"Hold Back My Tears"	Alfonzo Thompson, Jimmy Cobb	6:07
9.	"For All We Know"	J. Fred Coots, Sam M. Lewis	3:28
10.	"Look at the Rain"	Jackie Edward	3:04
11.	"Ease Away a Little Bit at a Time"	Clyde Otis, Rose Marie McCoy, Sampson Horton	3:40
