= Call My Name (album) =

Studio album by Etta James
- Released: January 27, 1967
- Recorded: December 1966
- Studio: Ter Mar Studios, Chicago
- Genre: Blues, R&B, soul
- Label: Cadet
- Producer: Monk Higgins & Ralph Bass

Etta James chronology
Queen of Soul (1964)	Call My Name (1967)	Tell Mama (1968)

Singles from Call My Name
- 1. "I Prefer You" Released: 1967; 2. "Don't Pick Me for Your Fool" Released: 1967; 3. "Call My Name" Released: 1967

Professional ratings
Review scores
Source	Rating
Allmusic	4/5 stars

Call My Name is the sixth studio album by American blues artist Etta James. The album was produced by Leonard Chess and released on January 27, 1967 by Cadet Records. The album was released on a 12-inch vinyl LP record containing 12 tracks, with six songs on each side of the album. It has been available as a CD volume since 2011, when reissued with additional tracks by Kent Records.

Call My Name was the second of a series of albums James would release that mainly consisted of Soul music. It was also the first album in James's catalog that did not produce a Top 40 single, with its highest charting track being "I Prefer You," which peaked on Billboard's Rhythm and Blues chart at #42. The other two singles from the release, "Don't Pick Me for Your Fool" and "Call My Name," failed to chart.

Allmusic gave the album four out of five stars, highlighting the tracks, "I'm So Glad (I Found Love in You)," "It Must Be Your Love," and "Don't Pick Me for Your Fool" as "standouts."

== Track listing ==
Side one

1. "Happiness" (Vee Pea Smith, Morris Dollison)
2. "That's All I Want from You" (M. Rotha)
3. "Have a Little Faith in Me" (Monk Higgins, Joyce Wrencher)
4. "I'm So Glad (I Found Love in You)" (Vee Pea Smith, Morris Dollison)
5. "You Are My Sunshine" (Jimmie Davis, Charles Mitchell)
6. "It Must Be Your Love" (Monk Higgins, Chuck Bernard, Morris Dollison, Billy Foster)

Side two

1. "842-3089 (Call My Name)" (Monk Higgins, Morris Dollison, Billy Foster)
2. "Don't Pick Me for Your Fool" (Monk Higgins, Morris Dollison, Billy Foster)
3. "I Prefer You" (Monk Higgins, Morris Dollison)
4. "Nobody Loves Me" (Monk Higgins, Joyce Wrencher)
5. "It's All Right" (Curtis Mayfield)
6. "Nobody Like You" (Monk Higgins, Morris Dollison)

== Charts ==
Singles - Billboard (United States)

Year	Single	Chart	Position
1967	"I Prefer You"	R&B Singles	42
