= Red-Hot & Live =

Etta, Red-Hot & Live

Live album by Etta James
- Released: 1982
- Length: 39:04
- Label: Quicksilver Records

Etta James chronology
Changes (1980)	Etta, Red-Hot & Live (1982)	Seven Year Itch (1989)

Etta, Red-Hot & Live is the second live album by American singer Etta James and her sixteenth album overall. It was released in 1982.

== Track listing ==
No.	Title	Writer(s)	Length
1.	"Respect Yourself"	Luther Ingram, Mack Rice	4:58
2.	"I'd Rather Go Blind"	Ellington Jordan, Bill Foster	4:36
3.	"Shake Yo' Bottle"	Ellington Jordan, B.J. Cook Foster	4:26
4.	"Dust Your Broom"	Elmore James	3:55
5.	"Summer Heat"		3:49
6.	"Drown in My Own Tears"	Henry Glover	4:36
7.	"Can't Turn You Loose"	Otis Redding	4:00
8.	"Rock Me Baby"	B.B. King, Joe Josea	3:28
9.	"Stormy Monday"	T-Bone Walker	5:16
