= Etta Is Betta Than Evvah! =

Studio album by Etta James
- Released: 1976
- Studios: All Platinum Studios, Englewood, New Jersey
- Genres: Funk, soul, R&B
- Label: Chess
- Producer: Mike Terry

Etta James chronology
Come a Little Closer (1974)	Etta Is Betta Than Evvah! (1976)	Deep in the Night (1978)

Professional ratings
Review scores
Source	Rating
AllMusic	4/5 stars
Christgau's Record Guide	B
The Encyclopedia of Popular Music	3/5 stars
The New Rolling Stone Record Guide	2/5 stars

Etta Is Betta Than Evvah! is the twelfth studio album by Etta James, released in 1976. It was her final studio album for Chess Records.

== Critical reception ==
AllMusic wrote that "the songs are just kind of generic: good-enough uptempo dance cuts and midtempo groovers, songs that give enough space for Etta but never really escape the confines of average '70s disco-oriented R&B." The Sunday Times wrote that the album "mixes tough funk and bluesy soul ballads."

== Track listing ==
No.	Title	Writer(s)	Length
1.	"Woman (Shake Your Booty)"	James, Brian Ray
2.	"A Love Vibration"	Ann Peebles, Don Bryant, Bernard "Bernie" Miller
3.	"Only a Fool"	James, Trevor Lawrence, Gabriel Mekler
4.	"Little Bit of Love"	Fred Beckmeier
5.	"Groove Me"	King Floyd
6.	"Jump Into Love"	Dennis Belfield, Ron Stockert
7.	"Leave Your Hat On"	Randy Newman
8.	"I've Been a Fool"	Fred Beckmeier
9.	"Blinded by Love"	Allen Toussaint
10.	"Ain't No Pity in the Naked City"	Buddy Scott, Phil Medley

== Personnel ==
- Etta James - vocals
- Brian Ray, Ken Marco, Tommy Keith, Walter Morris - guitar
- Chuck Rainey, Fred Beckmeier, Jonathan Williams - bass guitar
- Bernadette Randle, William Smith - keyboards
- Brian Cuomo - piano
- Clarence Oliver, Kenny Rice, Paul Mabry - drums
- King Errisson - congas, percussion
- Ron Stockert - clavinet on "Woman (Shake Your Booty)"
- Ron Rancifer - organ on "Woman (Shake Your Booty)"
- Gene Dinwiddie - saxophone on "Woman (Shake Your Booty)"
- Keith Johnson - trumpet on "Woman (Shake Your Booty)"

== Production ==
- Michael Zagaris - photography
