= Etta James Sings Funk =

Studio album by Etta James
- Released: 1970
- Recorded: Chicago, Illinois
- Genre: Blues, R&B, soul
- Label: Cadet
- Producer: Gene Barge, Ralph Bass

Etta James chronology
Tell Mama (1968)	Etta James Sings Funk (1970)	Losers Weepers (1971)

Singles from Etta James Sings Funk
- 1. "Tighten Up Your Own Thing" Released: 1969; 2. "Sound of Love" Released: 1970

Professional ratings
Review scores
Source	Rating
Christgau's Record Guide	B

Etta James Sings Funk is the eighth studio album by American Blues artist, Etta James. The album was released on Cadet Records in 1970.

== Release ==
The album was James's fourth release on the Cadet record label and was produced in Chicago, Illinois. The album includes a mix of Soul, Rhythm and Blues, and regular Blues. The album spawned two singles: "Tighten Up Your Own Thing" and "Sound of Love." While both singles were released to radio, neither of them charted the Rhythm and Blues or the Billboard Hot 100 charts in 1970. The album was released as 12-inch LP record and has not been reissued on compact disc in its entirety although five tracks were included as additional cuts on the reissue by Kent of Etta James' Losers Weepers' album in 2011.

== Critical reception ==
Reviewing in Christgau's Record Guide: Rock Albums of the Seventies (1981), Robert Christgau wrote: "As you can read on the back [sleeve], funk isn't a style or something like that—it's just, well, Etta. Etta with chorus, Etta with full brass, Etta with strings even. Etta singing a Gershwin song, Etta singing a Bee Gees song, Etta singing three Acuff-Rose songs, Etta singing four Pearl Woods songs. (Pearl Woods?) Highlights: the Acuff-Rose songs."

== Track listing ==
No.	Title	Writer(s)	Length
1.	"Tighten Up Your Own Thing"	Pearl Woods	2:40
2.	"Sweet Memories"	Mickey Newbury	3:35
3.	"Quick Reaction and Satisfaction"	Woods	2:35
4.	"Nothing from Nothing Leaves Nothing"	Johnnie Morisette	3:30
5.	"My Man Is Together"	Woods	4:10
6.	"Are My Thoughts with You"	Newbury	3:30
7.	"The Man I Love"	George Gershwin, Ira Gershwin	3:50
8.	"The Sound of Love"	Barry Gibb, Robin Gibb, Maurice Gibb	2:50
9.	"When I Stop Dreaming"	Ira Louvin, Charlie Louvin	2:35
10.	"What Fools We Mortals Be"	Etta James (as Jamesetta Rogers), Sam Ling, Jules Taub	3:05
11.	"Your Replacement"	Woods	3:07
