= Come a Little Closer (album) =

Studio album by Etta James
- Released: 1974
- Genre: Funk, soul, R&B
- Label: Chess; CH-60029
- Producer: Gabriel Mekler

Etta James chronology
Etta James (1973)	Come a Little Closer (1974)	Etta Is Betta Than Evvah! (1976)

Professional ratings
Review scores
Source	Rating
AllMusic	3/5 stars
Christgau's Record Guide	B−

Come a Little Closer is the eleventh studio album by Etta James, released in 1974 on the Chess label. The album reached a peak position of number 47 on Billboard's R&B Albums chart.

== Reception ==
AllMusic stated: "Etta James was fighting serious substance-abuse problems when this album was recorded, commuting to the sessions from a rehab center. It was a triumph simply to complete the record at all. But although James' life may have been in rough shape outside of the studio, she delivered a fairly strong set that fused forceful '70s soul arrangements with some rock, jazz, and New Orleans R&B."

== Track listing ==
No.	Title	Writer(s)	Length
1.	"Out on the Street Again"	Trevor Lawrence, Gabriel Mekler	4:20
2.	"Mama Told Me"	Trevor Lawrence, Gabriel Mekler, Catherine C. Williamson	2:31
3.	"You Give Me What I Want"	Trevor Lawrence, Gabriel Mekler	3:40
4.	"Come a Little Closer"	Trevor Lawrence, Gabriel Mekler, Catherine C. Williamson	3:31
5.	"Let's Burn Down the Cornfield"	Randy Newman	3:46
6.	"Power Play"	John Kay	3:26
7.	"Feeling Uneasy"	Trevor Lawrence, Gabriel Mekler	2:50
8.	"St. Louis Blues"	W.C. Handy	4:32
9.	"Gonna Have Some Fun Tonight"	Trevor Lawrence, Gabriel Mekler	4:03
10.	"Sookie, Sookie"	Don Covay, Steve Cropper	3:09
11.	"Lovin' Arms"	Tom Jans	3:49
12.	"Out on the Street Again (Single Edit)"	Trevor Lawrence, Gabriel Mekler	3:44

== Personnel ==
- Etta James – vocals
- Gabriel Mekler, Larry Nash – keyboards
- Danny Kortchmar, Ken Marco, Lowell George, Wah Wah Watson – guitar
- Larry Mizell – synthesizer
- Bobby Keys, Charles Dinwiddie, David Allan Duke, Gene Cipriano, Jim Horn, Lew McCreary, Steve Madaio, Trevor Lawrence – horn section
- Chuck Rainey – electric bass
- Kenneth "Spider Webb" Rice – drums
- Gary Coleman – percussion
- Carlena Williams, Gwen Edwards, Venetta Fields – backing vocals
- Trevor Lawrence – arrangement
