= Miss Etta James: The Complete Modern and Kent Recordings =

Compilation album by Etta James
- Released: December 6, 2005
- Recorded: Various
- Genre: Blues, jazz, R&B, soul
- Length: 108:23
- Label: Ace

1960 Crown Records Cover

Miss Etta James: The Complete Modern and Kent Recordings is a compilation album of songs by Etta James recorded for the Modern and Kent labels. This two-disc album presents all the recordings made by James prior to her signing with Chess Records. Several compilation albums of this material were released on the Crown label in the early 1960s under the titles Miss Etta James, The Best of Etta James and Twist with Etta James but this release represents the complete collection of James' recordings for the labels including several alternate takes.

== Reception ==
Professional ratings
Review scores
Source	Rating
Allmusic	4/5 stars

Allmusic awarded the album 4 stars with its review by Thom Jurek stating, "The Complete Modern and Kent Recordings, contain every side that the young powerhouse Etta James cut for Modern, Crown, and Kent between 1955 and 1961... Fans will have a lot of this material in various places, but this collection puts everything together in one slamming package... The liner essay by Tony Rounce is both authoritative and accessible, and gives a solid and revealing portrait of James' place in the pantheon and how her star rose. This is, in its way, an historic set because this is the first time all these sides have appeared in one place. Highly recommended".

== Track listing ==
Disc One

1. "The Wallflower (Dance with Me, Henry)" (Johnny Otis, Hank Ballard, Etta James) - 3:07
2. "Hold Me, Squeeze Me" (Joe Josea, Sam Ling, Jules Taub) - 2:32
3. "Hey Henry" (Frank Gallo, Josea) - 2:54
4. "Be Mine" (Chuck Berry, Josea) - 2:51
5. "Good Rockin' Daddy" (Berry, Josea) - 2:28
6. "Crazy Feeling" (James, Taub) - 3:19
7. "W-O-M-A-N" (James, Dorothy Hawkins, Jean Mitchell) - 2:47
8. "That's All" (Sister Rosetta Tharpe) - 2:16
9. "My One and Only" (James, Josea) - 2:31
10. "I'm a Fool" (Berry, Josea) - 2:32
11. "Shortnin' Bread Rock" (Eddie Brandt) - 2:32
12. "Tears of Joy" (Jerry Leiber, Mike Stoller) - 2:29
13. "Tough Lover" (James) - 2:11
14. "Fools We Mortals Be" (Hawkins) - 2:23
15. "Good Lookin'" (James, Josea) - 2:11
16. "Then I'll Care" (Hawkins) - 2:34
17. "The Pick-Up" (Raymond Johnson, Harold Battiste) - 2:22
18. "Market Place" (Rick Darnell, Ray Stanley) - 2:57
19. "Come What May" (James) - 2:07
20. "By the Light of the Silvery Moon" (Gus Edwards, Edward Madden) - 2:13

Disc Two

1. "Baby Baby Every Night" (Ed Townsend) - 2:25
2. "Sunshine of Love" (Maxwell Davis, Josea) - 2:27
3. "How Big a Fool" (John Marascalco, George Matola) - 2:41
4. "If It Ain't One Thing" (Harvey Fuqua, James) - 2:18
5. "I Hope You're Satisfied" (James, Taub) - 3:05
6. "Dance with Me, Henry" [alternate take] (Otis, Ballard, James) - 2:24
7. "Don't You Remember" (Josea, Taub) - 3:03
8. "Hickory Dickory Dock" (Howard Mandolph) - 3:03
9. "Nobody Loves You Like Me" (Fuqua, Berry Gordy) - 2:27
10. "We're in Love" (Fuqua, Gordy) - 1:48
11. "You Know What I Mean" (Gordy) - 3:06
12. "Strange Things Happening" (Tharpe) - 2:32
13. "Be My Lovey Dovey" (Berry, Josea) - 2:03
14. "Tough Lover"[alternate take] (James) - 2:30
15. "Good Lookin'" [alternate take] (James, Josea) - 2:09
16. "Hey Henry" [alternate take] (Gallo, Josea) - 2:59
17. "Crazy Feeling" [alternate take] (James, Taub) - 3:20
18. "Market Place" [alternate take] (Darnell, Stanley) - 2:53
19. "Hey Henry" [second alternate take] (Gallo, Josea) - 2:20
20. "Good Rockin' Daddy" [alternate take] (Berry, Josea) - 2:32
21. "How Big a Fool" [alternate take] (Marascalco, George Matola) - 2:49
22. "That's All" [alternate take] (Tharpe) - 2:13
