= The Right Time (Etta James album) =

Studio album by Etta James
- Released: 1992
- Genre: R&B
- Length: 44:14
- Label: Elektra
- Producer: Jerry Wexler

Etta James chronology
Stickin' to My Guns (1990)	The Right Time (1992)	Mystery Lady: Songs of Billie Holiday (1994)

Professional ratings
Review scores
Source	Rating
Allmusic	2/5 stars

The Right Time is the seventeenth studio album by Etta James, released in 1992.

== Track listing ==
No.	Title	Writer(s)	Length
1.	"I Sing the Blues"	Philip Wooten, Earl T. Bridgeman
2.	"Love and Happiness"	Al Green, Mabon "Teenie" Hodges
3.	"Evening of Love"	Ava Aldridge, Cindy Richardson
4.	"Wet Match"	George Jackson, Johnny Davis, Rosetta Anderson
5.	"You're Taking Up Another Man's Place"	Isaac Hayes, David Porter
6.	"Give It Up"	Allen Toussaint
7.	"Let It Rock"	Etta James, Josh Sklair
8.	"Ninety Nine and a Half (Won't Do)"	Steve Cropper, Eddie Floyd
9.	"You've Got Me"	L. Russell Brown, Billy Vera
10.	"Nighttime Is the Right Time"	Lew Herman
11.	"Down Home Blues"	George Jackson

== Personnel ==
- Etta James - vocals
- Lucky Peterson - organ, guitar
- Doug Bartenfeld, Steve Cropper, Jay Johnson, Jimmy Johnson, Will McFarlane - guitar
- Steve Winwood - vocals on "Give It Up"
- Hank Crawford - alto saxophone
- Gary Armstrong, Mike Haynes - trumpet
- Frank Crawford - synthesizer
- Steve Ferrone, Roger Hawkins - drums
- David Hood, Willie Weeks - bass guitar
- Jim Horn - baritone saxophone
- Clayton Ivey - piano
- Marie Lewey - backing vocals
- Cindy Richardson Walker - backing vocals
- Tom Roady - percussion
- George Soulé - backing vocals
- Harvey Thompson - tenor saxophone
- Kirk "Jelly Roll" Johnson - harmonica
