= The Dreamer (Etta James album) =

Studio album by Etta James
- Released: November 8, 2011
- Recorded: 2008
- Studios: Fort Athens Studios, Riverside, California
- Genre: Blues
- Length: 50:20
- Label: Verve Forecast
- Producers: Etta James, Josh Sklair, Danto and Sametto

Etta James chronology
All the Way (2006)	The Dreamer (2011)	Collected (2019)

Professional ratings
Review scores
Source	Rating
AllMusic	3.5/5 stars
The Daily Telegraph	3.5/5 stars
The Independent	4/5 stars
MSN Music (Expert Witness)	A−

The Dreamer is the twenty-ninth and final studio album recorded by American R&B singer Etta James. It was released on November 8, 2011, two months before her death, as she battled with leukemia.

== Track listing ==
No.	Title	Original artist	Length
1.	"Groove Me"	King Floyd	4:40
2.	"Champagne & Wine"	Otis Redding	3:58
3.	"Dreamer"	Bobby Bland	4:58
4.	"Welcome to the Jungle"	Guns N' Roses	3:01
5.	"Misty Blue"	Bob Montgomery	4:58
6.	"Boondocks"	Little Big Town	4:12
7.	"Cigarettes & Coffee"	Otis Redding	6:22
8.	"In the Evening"	Ray Charles	4:47
9.	"Too Tired"	Johnny "Guitar" Watson	2:32
10.	"That's the Chance You Take"	Johnny "Guitar" Watson	3:48
11.	"Let Me Down Easy"	Little Milton	7:04
Total length:			50:20
