= Classic Rock Gold =

Compilation album by Various
- Released: April 26, 2005
- Recorded: 1968–1987
- Genre: Rock
- Length: 2.3 hours
- Label: Hip-O Records
- Producer: Pat Lawrence; Dana Smart

Professional ratings
Review scores
Source	Rating
AllMusic	4.5/5 stars
MSN Music (Consumer Guide)	A−

Classic Rock Gold is a two-disc compilation album released in 2005. It features thirty-three of the greatest hits to come out of classic rock, many of which are from the Universal Music Group catalogue.

The cover features, clockwise from the top left: Whitesnake, Lynyrd Skynyrd, Steppenwolf, Scorpions, Joe Walsh, Rod Stewart and Peter Frampton (all of which recorded for labels that were later merged into what is now Universal Music Group).

== Track listing ==
=== Disc one ===
1. Steppenwolf – "Born to Be Wild" (3:30) (Bonfire) (1968)
2. Santana – "Evil Ways" (3:57) (Henry/Zack) (1970)
3. The Guess Who – "American Woman" (5:07) (Bachman/Cummings/Kale/Peterson) (1970)
4. Free – "All Right Now" (5:30) (Rodgers/Fraser) (1973)
5. Jethro Tull – "Locomotive Breath" (4:33) (Anderson) (1972)
6. The James Gang – "Walk Away" (3:34) (Walsh) (1972)
7. Rod Stewart – "Maggie May" (5:46) (Stewart) (1971)
8. Ten Years After – "I'd Love to Change the World" (3:44) (Lee) (1971)
9. The Hollies – "Long Cool Woman (In a Black Dress)" (3:17) (Clarke/Cook/Greenaway) (1972)
10. The Edgar Winter Group – "Frankenstein" (4:45) (Winter) (1973)
11. Elton John – "Saturday Night's Alright for Fighting" (4:55) (John/Taupin) (1973)
12. Grand Funk Railroad – "We're an American Band" (3:26) (Brewer) (1974)
13. Joe Walsh – "Rocky Mountain Way" (5:16) (Walsh/Grace/Passarelli/Vitale) (1973)
14. The Doobie Brothers – "China Grove" (3:16) (Johnston) (1974)
15. Golden Earring – "Radar Love" (6:25) (Hay/Kooymans) (1974)
16. Lynyrd Skynyrd – "Sweet Home Alabama" (4:41) (Van Zant/King/Rossington) (1974)
17. Bachman–Turner Overdrive – "You Ain't Seen Nothing Yet" (3:53) (Bachman) (1974)

=== Disc two ===
1. Bad Company – "Bad Company" (4:48) (Rodgers/Kirke) (1973)
2. Nazareth – "Hair of the Dog" (4:09) (1975)
3. Head East – "Never Been Any Reason" (5:11) (1975)
4. Foghat – "Slow Ride" [Single version] (3:56) (Peverett) (1976)
5. Peter Frampton – "Show Me the Way" [Live] (4:39) (Frampton) (1976)
6. Blue Öyster Cult – "(Don't Fear) The Reaper" (5:09) (Roeser) (1976)
7. Foreigner – "Cold as Ice" [Single version] (3:20) (Gramm/Jones) (1977)
8. Ted Nugent – "Cat Scratch Fever" (3:39) (Nugent) (1978)
9. The Cars – "Just What I Needed" (3:45) (Ocasek) (1979)
10. Eddie Money – "Two Tickets to Paradise" (3:49) (Money) (1978)
11. Cheap Trick – "I Want You to Want Me" [Live] (3:42) (Nielsen) (1979)
12. .38 Special – "Hold On Loosely" (4:40) (Barnes/Carlisi/Peterik) (1981)
13. Red Rider – "Lunatic Fringe" (4:22) (Cochrane) (1981)
14. Billy Idol – "White Wedding" (4:13) (Idol) (1982)
15. Scorpions – "Rock You Like a Hurricane" (4:12) (Schenker/Meine/Rarebell) (1984)
16. Whitesnake – "Here I Go Again" (4:35) (Coverdale/Marsden) (1987)

== Personnel ==
- Jorgen Angel – photography
- Randy Bachman – producer
- Bad Company – producer
- Roy Thomas Baker – producer
- Bruce Botnick – producer
- Roger Boyd – producer
- Emily Cagan – product manager
- Paul Canty – photography, cover photo
- Manny Charlton – producer
- Brent Dangerfield – producer
- Cliff Davies – producer
- Rick Derringer – producer
- Dieter Dierks – producer
- Henry Diltz – photography, cover photo
- Jack Douglas – producer
- Gus Dudgeon – producer
- Keith Forsey – producer
- Simon Fowler – photography
- Peter Frampton – producer
- Lew Futterman – producer
- Richie Gallo – photography
- The Hollies – producer
- Nick Jameson – producer
- Al Kooper – producer
- Murray Krugman – producer
- Richard Landis – producer
- Pat Lawrence – compilation producer
- David Lucas – producer
- Gavin Lurssen – mastering
- Gary Lyons – producer
- Ross Marino – photography, cover photo
- Ian McDonald – collaboration
- Gabriel Mekler – producer
- Rodney Mills – producer
- Ryan Null – photo research
- Keith Olsen – producer
- Sandy Pearlman – producer
- Michael Putland – photography, cover photo
- Ron Richards – producer
- Todd Rundgren – producer
- Santana – producer
- Dana Smart – compilation producer
- Shannon Steckloff – production coordination
- Dave Steen – photography, cover photo
- Rod Stewart – producer
- Mike Stone – producer
- Bill Szymczyk – producer
- Ted Templeman – producer
- Joe Walsh – producer
- Tom Werman – producer
- Chris Wright – executive producer
- Michael Zagaris – photography

== See also ==
- Classic rock
- Album-oriented rock
