= Gold (Ella Fitzgerald album) =

Greatest hits album by Ella Fitzgerald
- Released: 2007
- Recorded: 1938–1964
- Genre: Swing, traditional pop, vocal jazz
- Label: Verve

Professional ratings
Review scores
Source	Rating
AllMusic	4.5/5 stars

Gold is a two-disc compilation album by Ella Fitzgerald that was released on the Verve Records label in 2007. The 40 tracks span Fitzgerald's career from 1938 to 1964.

== Music ==
The first disc contains material originally released by Decca Records; the second is taken from Verve releases. The 40 tracks were recorded between May 1938 and October 1964.

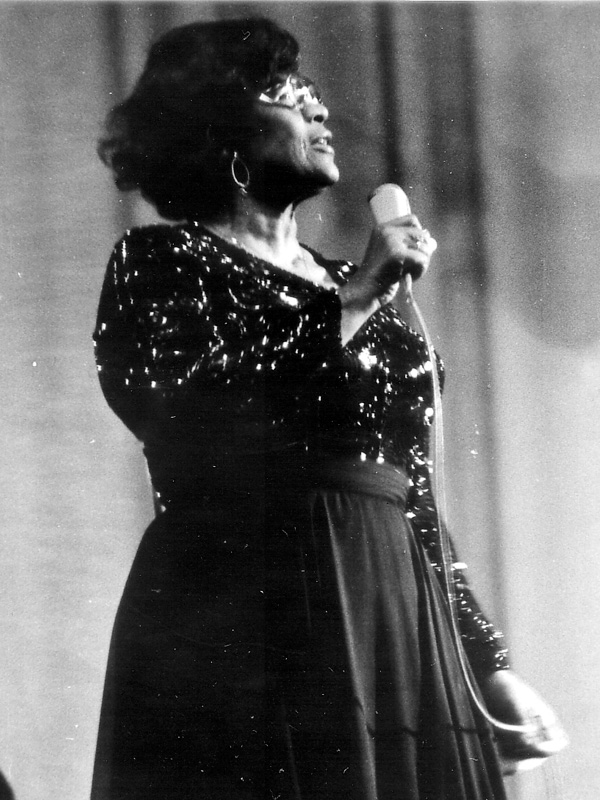
Fitzgerald performing in 1975

The JazzTimes reviewer commented that "Fitzgerald's fiery early collaborations with Chick Webb, Louis Jordan, Sy Oliver, Louis Armstrong and others bring the Decca half to a boil, and well-chosen selections from the Songbook recordings more than adequately characterize the sizzling Fitzgerald of the '50s and '60s."

== Track listing ==
=== Disc One: The Decca Years ===
1. "A-Tisket, A-Tasket"
2. "Undecided"
3. "Stairway to the Stars"
4. "Betcha Nickel"
5. "Cow Cow Boogie"
6. "Into Each Life Some Rain Must Fall"
7. "It's Only a Paper Moon"
8. "Flying Home"
9. "Stone Cold Dead in the Market"
10. "I'm Just a Lucky So and So"
11. "My Happiness"
12. "Black Coffee"
13. "In the Evening (When the Sun Goes Down)"
14. "Dream a Little Dream of Me"
15. "Someone to Watch Over Me"
16. "Smooth Sailing"
17. "Airmail Special"
18. "Goody Goody"
19. "Angel Eyes"
20. "You'll Have to Swing It (Mr. Paganini)"
21. "Lullaby of Birdland"
22. "Hard Hearted Hannah"

=== Disc Two: The Verve Years ===
1. "Just One of Those Things"
2. "In the Still of the Night"
3. "The Lady Is a Tramp"
4. "Just Sittin' and a-Rockin'"
5. "Take the "A" Train"
6. "They All Laughed"
7. "Summertime"
8. "Oh, Lady Be Good (Live)"
9. "Blue Skies"
10. "Swinging Shepherd Blues"
11. "Love Is Here to Stay"
12. "Mack the Knife (Live)"
13. "How High the Moon (Live)"
14. "Misty"
15. "Blues in the Night"
16. "A Fine Romance"
17. "All the Things You Are"
18. "Too Marvelous For Words"

== Charts ==
Chart	Peak position
Australian Albums (ARIA)	48
Belgian Albums (Ultratop Wallonia)	50
Swedish Albums (Sverigetopplistan)	11
Scottish Albums (OCC)	27
UK Albums (OCC)	15

== Certifications ==
Region	Certification	Certified units/sales
United Kingdom (BPI)	Platinum	300,000^{‡}
^{‡} Sales+streaming figures based on certification alone.
