= Let's Roll (album) =

Studio album by Etta James
- Released: May 6, 2003
- Recorded: 2003
- Genres: Blues, country
- Length: 56:29
- Label: Private Music
- Producers: Etta James, Josh Sklair, Donto Metto James, Sametto James

Etta James chronology
| Burnin' Down the House: Live at the House of Blues (2002) | Let's Roll (2003) | Live in New York (2003) |

Let's Roll is the twenty-sixth studio album by Etta James. It won a Grammy Award for Best Contemporary Blues Album in 2003, and also won a W. C. Handy Award as the Soul/Blues Album of the Year from the Blues Foundation in 2004.

Professional ratings
Review scores
| Source | Rating |
|---|---|
| AllMusic | 4/5 stars |
| The Penguin Guide to Blues Recordings | 3/4 stars |

== Track listing ==
1. "Somebody to Love" – 5:58 (Delbert McClinton, Gary Nicholson)
2. "The Blues Is My Business" – 3:33 (Kevin Bowe, Todd Cerney)
3. "Leap of Faith" – 4:00 (Glen Clarke, Nicholson)
4. "Strongest Weakness" – 4:53 (Bekka Bramlett, Nicholson)
5. "Wayward Saints of Memphis" – 5:42 (Bowe, McClinton)
6. "Lie No Better" – 3:31 (Nicholson)
7. "Trust Yourself" – 4:45 (Bowe, Grady Champion)
8. "A Change Is Gonna Do Me Good" – 5:23 (Al Anderson, Bob DiPiero)
9. "Old Weakness" – 3:12 (Nicholson)
10. "Stacked Deck" – 8:01 (Billy Wright)
11. "On the 7th Day" – 5:01 (Bowe, Kostas)
12. "Please, No More" – 4:40 (David Egan, Greg Hansen)

== Personnel ==
- Josh Sklair - Banjo, Guitar (12 String), Guitar (Acoustic), Guitar (Electric), Slide Guitar, Synthesizer
- Donto James - Drums, Percussion, Vocals
- Sametto James - Bass guitar
- Tom Poole - Trumpet
- Lee Thornburg - Trombone
- Jimmy "Z" Zavala - Harmonica, Saxophone (Baritone), Saxophone (Tenor)
- Bobby Murray - electric guitar
