= Stickin' to My Guns =

Studio album by Etta James
- Released: June 19, 1990
- Studio: Digital Recorders, Nashville, Tennessee; OmniSound Studios, Nashville, Tennessee
- Genre: Funk rock
- Label: Island
- Producer: Barry Beckett

Etta James chronology
Seven Year Itch (1989)	Stickin' to My Guns (1990)	The Right Time (1992)

Professional ratings
Review scores
Source	Rating
AllMusic	2/5 stars
Calgary Herald	A
The Encyclopedia of Popular Music	4/5 stars
MusicHound Rock: The Essential Album Guide	2/5 stars
The Rolling Stone Album Guide	3/5 stars
Windsor Star	A

Stickin' to My Guns is the sixteenth studio album by Etta James, released in 1990. It was nominated for a Grammy for "Best Contemporary Blues Recording".

== Production ==
The album contains a duet with rapper Def Jef. Although it reunited her with several Muscle Shoals musicians, James later expressed ambivalence about the more electronic sound of the album. Stickin' to My Guns was produced by Barry Beckett.

== Critical reception ==
Rolling Stone called the album "a nonstop dance party filled with house rockers like 'Love to Burn' and turn-the-lights-down-low, slow-grind numbers like 'Your Good Thing (Is About to End)'." MusicHound Rock: The Essential Album Guide deemed it "a largely unsuccessful attempt to incorporate rap and hip-hop into a more traditional R&B context." The New York Times called it "the best album Aretha Franklin never made, as Ms. James belts out songs about lovers and deceivers."

== Track listing ==
No.	Title	Writer(s)	Length
1.	"Whatever Gets You Through the Night"	Carson Whitsett, Dan Penn, Hoy "Bucky" Lindsey	3:48
2.	"Love to Burn"	Bud Reneau, Dobie Gray, Ricky Ray Rector	3:29
3.	"The Blues Don't Care"	Etta James	3:41
4.	"Your Good Thing (Is About to End)"	Isaac Hayes, David Porter	3:52
5.	"Get Funky"	Danny Rhodes	4:45
6.	"Beware"	Eric Randle	3:39
7.	"Out of the Rain"	Tony Joe White	4:33
8.	"Stolen Affection"	Jim Hurt, Jonnie Barnett	3:52
9.	"A Fool in Love"	Andy Fraser, Frankie Miller	3:24
10.	"I've Got Dreams To Remember"	Joe Rock, Otis Redding, Zelma Redding	4:28

== Personnel ==
- Etta James - lead vocals
- Barry Beckett - keyboards
- Gary Burnette, Teenie Hodges, Danny Rhodes, Josh Sklair - acoustic guitar
- Thomas Cain - backing vocals
- Carol Chase - backing vocals
- Ashley Cleveland - backing vocals
- Def Jef - backing vocals
- Quitman Dennis, Jack Hale, John Dewey McKnight - trombone
- Brother Gene Dinwiddie - tenor saxophone
- Greg Donerson - percussion
- Dobie Gray - backing vocals
- Roger Hawkins - drums
- Mike Haynes, Fernando Pullum - trumpet
- Jim Horn - baritone saxophone
- Mike Lawler - synthesizer
- Carl Marsh - programming, synthesizer
- Arik Marshall, Leo Nocentelli, Reggie Young - electric guitar
- Jonell Mosser - backing vocals
- David Patterson - baritone saxophone, tenor saxophone
- Jim Pugh - keyboards, piano
- Michael Rhodes, Bobby Vega - bass guitar
- Jimmie Wood - harmonica
