= Seven Year Itch (Etta James album) =

Studio album by Etta James
- Released: September 26, 1988
- Studios: Digital Recorders, Nashville, Tennessee
- Genres: Funk, Soul
- Label: Island
- Producers: Barry Beckett, Ricky Fataar (tracks: 4, 6, 8), Rob Fraboni (tracks: 4, 6, 8)

Etta James chronology
Etta, Red-Hot & Live (1982)	Seven Year Itch (1988)	Stickin' to My Guns (1990)

Seven Year Itch is the fifteenth studio album by Etta James, released in 1988 by Island Records. The title of the album refers to her comeback after approximately seven years without a major recording contract. The album was described as "the first in her career to consistently capture the magic of James at her live best," while "her voice stretches out with more sureness and authority than ever."

== Track listing ==
No.	Title	Writer(s)	Length
1.	"I Got the Will"	Otis Redding	2:44
2.	"Jump into My Fire"	Johnny Cobb, Jana King	3:54
3.	"Shakey Ground"	Jeffrey Bowen, Alphonso Boyd, Eddie Hazel	3:06
4.	"Come to Mama"	Willie Mitchell, Earl Randle	4:09
5.	"Damn Your Eyes"	Steve Bogard, Barbara Wyrick	3:57
6.	"Breaking Up Somebody's Home"	Al Jackson, Jr., Timothy Matthews	4:15
7.	"The Jealous Kind"	Robert Guidry	3:58
8.	"How Strong Is a Woman?"	Bettye Crutcher	3:17
9.	"It Ain't Always What You Do (It's Who You Let See You Do It)"	Carl Hampton, Homer Banks, Raymond Jackson	3:27
10.	"One Night"	Mike Reid, Troy Seals	4:03

== Personnel ==
- Etta James – vocals
- James "Hutch" Hutchinson, Willie Weeks, Bob Wray – bass
- Ricky Fataar, Roger Hawkins – drums
- Steve Cropper, Kenny Greenberg, Reggie Young – guitar
- Barry Beckett, Art Neville – keyboards
- Jim Horn – saxophone, horn arrangements
- Jack Hale, Mike Haynes, Quitman Dennis – horns

Technical

- Barry Beckett (tracks: 4, 6, 8), Scott Hendricks – mixing
- Barry Beckett, Ricky Fataar (tracks: 4, 6, 8), Rob Fraboni (tracks: 4, 6, 8) – producer
- Howard Steele, Rich Schirmer, Scott Hendricks – recording
