= Deep in the Night =

Studio album by Etta James
- Released: 1978
- Genre: R&B
- Label: Warner Bros.
- Producer: Jerry Wexler

Etta James chronology
Etta Is Betta Than Evvah! (1976)	Deep in the Night (1978)	Changes (1980)

Deep in the Night is a studio album by the American musician Etta James, released in 1978.

== Critical reception ==
Professional ratings
Review scores
Source	Rating
AllMusic	4/5 stars
Christgau's Record Guide	B
Q	4/5 stars
The Rolling Stone Album Guide	3/5 stars
The Village Voice	B

The New York Times called James "a distinctive rhythm-and-blues singer," and noted that the rock and country covers sometimes make "the stylistic disjunction seem rather obtrusive."

== Track listing ==
No.	Title	Writer(s)	Length
1.	"Laying Beside You"	Eugene Record	4:10
2.	"Piece of My Heart"	Bert Berns, Jerry Ragavoy	3:37
3.	"Only Women Bleed"	Alice Cooper, Dick Wagner	4:01
4.	"Take It to the Limit"	Randy Meisner, Glenn Frey, Don Henley	4:12
5.	"Deep in the Night"	Helen Miller, Eve Merriam	4:50
6.	"Lovesick Blues"	Irving Mills, Cliff Friend	3:17
7.	"Strange Man"	Dorothy Love Coates	3:18
8.	"Sugar on the Floor"	Kiki Dee	4:43
9.	"Sweet Touch of Love"	Allen Toussaint	3:19
10.	"Blind Girl"	Billy Foster, Ellington Jordan	5:41

== Personnel ==
- Ed Thrasher – artwork by (art direction)
- Alexander Hamilton, Gilbert Ivey, Henry Jackson, Joyce Austin, Merry Clayton, Reuben Franklin – backing vocals
- Chuck Rainey – bass guitar
- Jeff Porcaro – drums
- Keith Johnson – electric piano
- Bruce Robb, Joe Chiccarelli – engineer
- Cornell Dupree – lead guitar
- Larry Carlton – rhythm guitar
- Brian Ray – slide guitar
- Bruce Robb, Dee Robb – mixed by
- Richard Tee – organ, piano
- Tom Roady – percussion
- Jim McCrary – photography
- Jim Horn, Plas Johnson – saxophone
