= Etta James =

American blues singer (1938–2012)

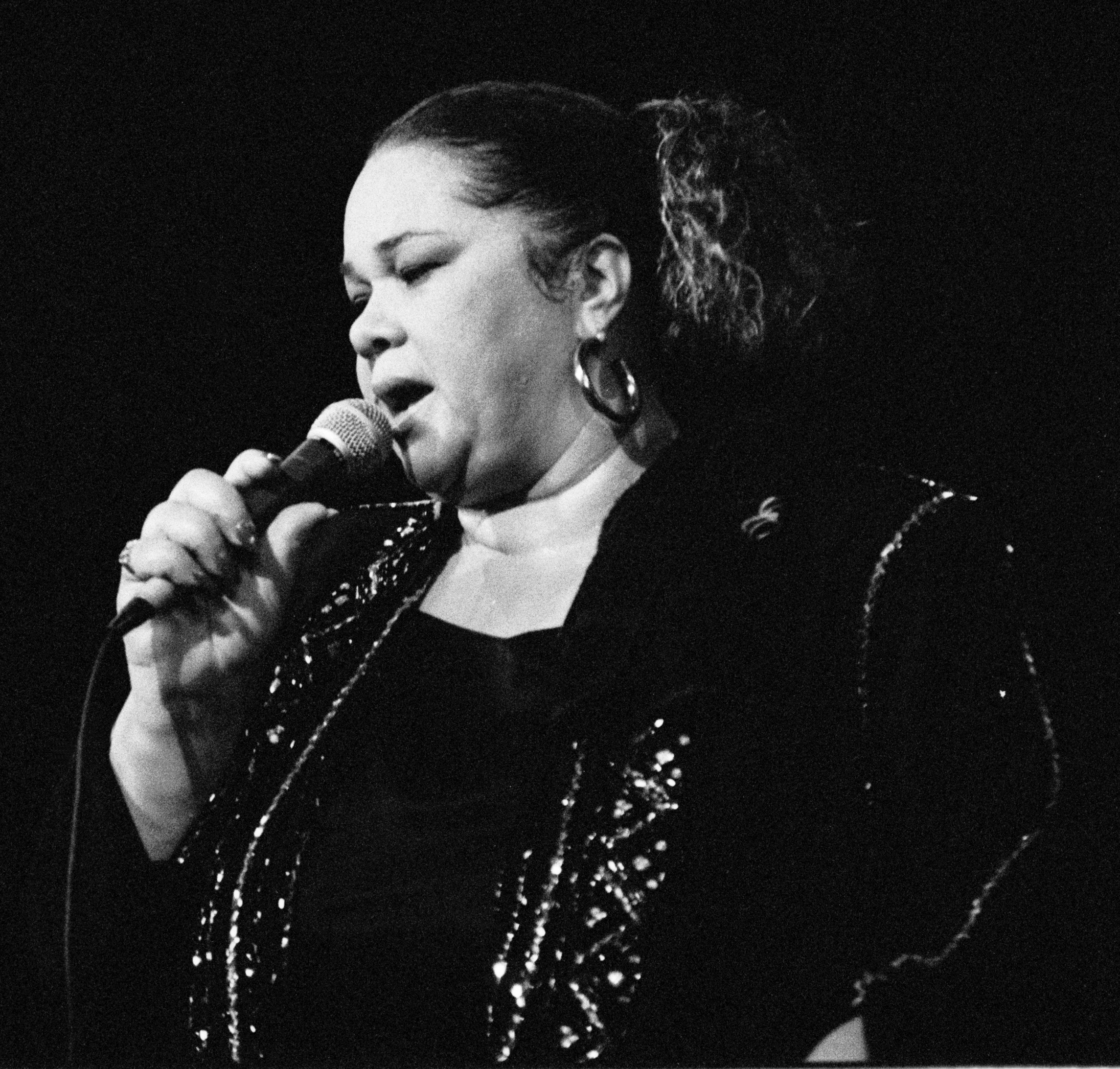
- James performing in France in 1990

Background information
- Born: Jamesetta Hawkins; January 25, 1938; Los Angeles, California, U.S.
- Died: January 20, 2012 (aged 73) Riverside, California, U.S.
- Genres: Gospel; blues; jazz; R&B; rock and roll; soul
- Occupations: Singer; songwriter
- Years active: 1954–2011
- Labels: Modern; Chess; MCA; Argo; Crown; Cadet; Island; PolyGram; Private; RCA; RCA Victor; Elektra; Virgin; EMI; Verve Forecast; Universal; Ace Records; Blues Interaction, Inc.

Jamesetta Hawkins (January 25, 1938 – January 20, 2012), known professionally as Etta James, was an American singer and songwriter. Starting her career in 1954, James frequently performed in Nashville's R&B clubs, collectively known in the 1940s, 1950s and 1960s as the Chitlin' Circuit. She sang in various genres, including gospel, blues, jazz, R&B, rock and roll and soul and gained fame with hits such as "The Wallflower" (1955), "At Last" (1960), "Something's Got a Hold on Me" (1962), "Tell Mama" and "I'd Rather Go Blind" (both 1967). James faced a number of personal problems, including heroin addiction, severe physical abuse and incarceration, before making a musical comeback in the late 1980s with the album Seven Year Itch (1988).

James's deep and earthy voice is considered to have bridged the gap between R&B and rock and roll. She won three Grammy Awards for her albums (2005 - Best Traditional Blues Album for Blues to the Bone; 2004 - Best Contemporary Blues Album for Let's Roll and 1995 - Best Jazz Vocal Performance, Female for Mystery Lady: Songs of Billie Holiday) and 17 Blues Music Awards. James was inducted into the Rock and Roll Hall of Fame in 1993, the Grammy Hall of Fame in 1999, and the Blues Hall of Fame in 2001. She also received the Grammy Lifetime Achievement Award in 2003. Rolling Stone magazine ranked James number 22 on its 2008 list of the "100 Greatest Singers of All Time"; she was also ranked number 62 in its list of the "100 Greatest Artists of All Time". Billboard magazine's 2015 list of the "35 Greatest R&B Artists of All Time" also included James, whose "gutsy, take-no-prisoner vocals colorfully interpreted everything from blues and R&B/soul to rock n’roll, jazz and gospel." The Rock and Roll Hall of Fame named her "one of the greatest voices of her century" and "forever the matriarch of blues."

The musical At Last: The Etta James Story, featuring Vika Bull as James, has toured Australia, New Zealand, and the UK since its premiere in 2013.

== Life and career ==
=== 1938–1959: Childhood and career beginnings ===
James was born Jamesetta Hawkins on January 25, 1938, in Los Angeles, California, to Dorothy Hawkins, who was only 14 at the time. Although her father was never identified, James speculated that she was the daughter of pool player Rudolf "Minnesota Fats" Wanderone, whom she met briefly in 1987. Often, her mother had gone off from their apartment in Watts with men. James lived with a series of foster parents, most notably "Sarge" and "Mama" Lu. James referred to her mother as "the Mystery Lady". Growing up, James was raised by relatives and friends. She began going to a Baptist church while in the care of her grandparents.

James received her first professional vocal training at the age of five from James Earle Hines, musical director of the Echoes of Eden choir at the St. Paul Baptist Church in South-Central Los Angeles. She became a soloist in the choir despite her young age and performed with them on local radio stations. James quickly gained attention for having a strong voice for a child. Hines often punched her in the chest while she sang to force her voice to come from her gut.

Sarge, like Hines, was also abusive. During drunken poker games at home, he would awaken James in the early morning hours and force her with beatings to sing for his friends. The trauma of her foster father forcing her to sing under these humiliating circumstances caused her to have difficulties with singing on demand throughout her career.

In 1950, Mama Lu died, and James' biological mother took her to the Fillmore district of San Francisco. Within a couple of years, James began listening to doo-wop and was inspired to form a girl group, the Creolettes (so named for the members' light-skinned complexions).

At age 14, James met musician Johnny Otis. Stories on how they met vary. In Otis' version, she came to his hotel after one of his performances in the city and persuaded him to audition her. Another story was that Otis spotted the Creolettes performing at a Los Angeles nightclub and sought for them to record his "answer song" to Hank Ballard's "Work with Me, Annie". Otis took the Creolettes under his wing and helped them sign to Modern Records, at which point they changed their name to Peaches. At this time, Otis also gave James her stage name, transposing "Jamesetta" (her given first name) into "Etta James." In 1954, James recorded and was credited as co-author for "The Wallflower" (a title change to the aforementioned song, "Work with Me, Annie"), which was released in early 1955. The original title of the song was actually "Roll with Me, Henry", but it had been changed to avoid censorship at the time (roll implying sexual activity). In February 1955, the song reached number one on the Hot Rhythm & Blues Tracks chart. Its success also gave the Peaches an opening spot on Little Richard's national tour.

While James was on tour with Richard, pop singer Georgia Gibbs recorded a version of her song and released it under the again-altered title "Dance With Me, Henry." It became a crossover hit, reaching number one on the Billboard Hot 100, which angered James.

After leaving the Peaches, James had another R&B hit with "Good Rockin' Daddy" but struggled with follow-ups. When her contract with Modern came up for renewal in 1960, James signed a contract with Chess Records instead, with which she would go on to become one of the label's earliest stars. Around this time, James became involved in a relationship with the singer Harvey Fuqua, the founder of the doo-wop group the Moonglows.

Musician Bobby Murray toured with James for over 20 years. He wrote that James had her first hit single when she was 15 years old and went steady with B.B. King when she was 16. James believed that King's hit single "Sweet Sixteen" was about her. In early 1955, James and an aspiring singer, the 19-year-old Elvis Presley, then recording for Sun Studios and an avid fan of King's, shared a bill in a large club just outside Memphis. In her autobiography, James noted how impressed she was with the young singer's manners. James also recalled how happy he made her many years later when she found out that it was Presley who had moved her close friend Jackie Wilson from a substandard convalescent home to a more appropriate facility and, as she put it, paid all the expenses. Presley died a year later. Wilson went on to live for another 10 years in the care center Presley found for him.

=== 1960–1978: Chess and Warner Bros. years ===
James' first hit singles with Fuqua were "If I Can't Have You" and "Spoonful". Her first solo hit was the doo-wop–styled rhythm-and-blues song "All I Could Do Was Cry", which was a number two R&B hit. Chess Records co-founder Leonard Chess envisioned James as a classic ballad stylist who had potential to cross over to the pop charts and soon surrounded the singer with violins and other string instruments. The first string-laden ballad James recorded was "My Dearest Darling" in May 1960, which peaked in the top five of the R&B chart. James sang background vocals for her labelmate Chuck Berry on his "Back in the U.S.A."

James' debut album, At Last!, was released in late 1960 and was noted for its varied selection of music, from jazz standards to blues to doo-wop and rhythm and blues (R&B). The album included the future classics "I Just Want to Make Love to You" and "A Sunday Kind of Love". In early 1961, James released what was to become her signature song, "At Last", a Glenn Miller tune, which reached number two on the R&B chart and number 47 on the Billboard Hot 100. Though the record was not as successful as expected, her rendition has become the best-known version of the song. James followed this with "Trust in Me", which also included string instruments. Later in 1960, James released a second studio album, The Second Time Around. The album took the same direction as her first, covering jazz and pop standards and with strings on many of the songs. It produced two hit singles, "Fool That I Am" and "Don't Cry Baby".

James started adding gospel elements in her music the following year, releasing "Something's Got a Hold on Me", which peaked at number four on the R&B chart and was a Top 40 pop hit. That success was quickly followed by "Stop the Wedding", which reached number six on the R&B chart and also had gospel elements. In 1963, James had another major hit with "Pushover" and released the live album Etta James Rocks the House, recorded at the New Era Club in Nashville, Tennessee. After a couple of years of minor hits, James' career started to suffer after 1965. After a period of isolation, she returned to recording in 1967 and reemerged with more gutsy R&B numbers thanks to her recording at the legendary FAME Studios in Muscle Shoals, Alabama. These sessions yielded her comeback hit "Tell Mama", co-written by Clarence Carter, which reached number 10 on the R&B chart and number 23 for pop. An album of the same name was also released that year and included James' take on Otis Redding's "Security". The B-side of "Tell Mama" was "I'd Rather Go Blind", which became a blues classic and has been recorded by many other artists. In her autobiography, Rage to Survive, James wrote that she heard the song outlined by her friend Ellington "Fugi" Jordan when she visited him in prison. According to her account, James wrote the rest of the song with Jordan but for tax reasons gave her songwriting credit to her partner at the time, Billy Foster.

Following this success, James became an in-demand concert performer, though she never again reached the heyday of her early to mid-1960s success. James' records continued to chart in the R&B Top 40 in the early 1970s, with singles such as "Losers Weepers" (1970) and "I Found a Love" (1972). Though James continued to record for Chess, she was devastated by the death of record executive Leonard Chess in 1969. James ventured into rock and funk with the release of her self-titled album in 1973, with production from the famed rock producer Gabriel Mekler, who had worked with Steppenwolf and Janis Joplin. Joplin had admired James and had covered "Tell Mama" in concert. James' 1973 album, exhibiting a mixture of musical styles, was nominated for a Grammy Award. However, the album did not produce any major hits, and neither did the follow-up album, Come a Little Closer, in 1974, though, like '73's Etta James before it, the album was also critically acclaimed.

In 1975, James opened for comedian Richard Pryor at the Shubert Theatre in Los Angeles. She continued to record for Chess (now owned by All Platinum Records), releasing one more album in 1976, Etta Is Betta Than Evvah!. James' 1978 album Deep in the Night, produced by Jerry Wexler for Warner Bros., incorporated more rock-based music in her repertoire. That same year, James was the opening act for the Rolling Stones and performed at the Montreux Jazz Festival. However, she left Chess Records following this brief success and did not record for another 10 years while struggling with drug addiction and alcoholism.

=== 1982–1998: Continued performances and return to recording ===
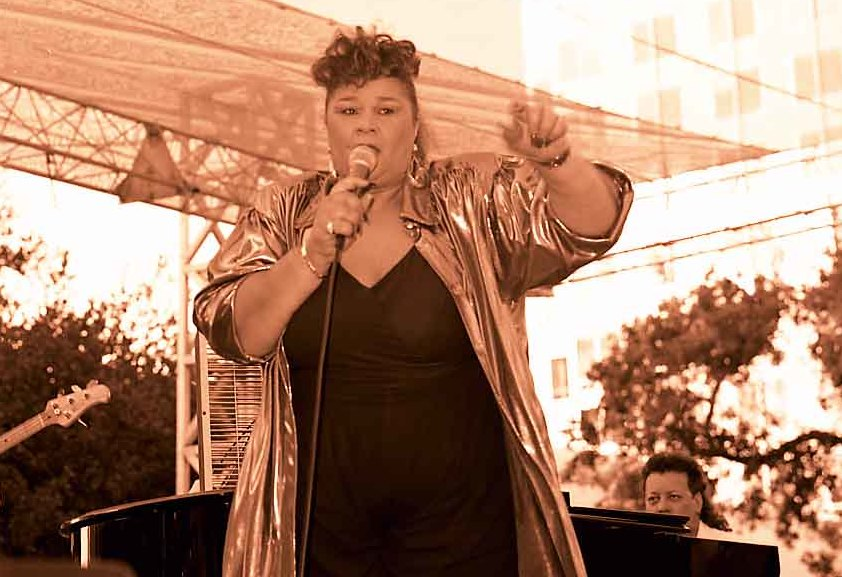
James performing in 2000

During her hiatus from recording, James still performed on occasion through the early and mid-1980s, including two guest appearances at Grateful Dead concerts in December 1982, and was a guest on John Mayall's Blues Breakers 1982 reunion show in New Jersey. In 1984, she contacted David Wolper and asked to perform in the opening ceremony of the 1984 Summer Olympics, at which she sang "When the Saints Go Marching In". Three years later, James performed "Rock and Roll Music" with Chuck Berry in the documentary film Hail! Hail! Rock 'n' Roll.

In 1989, James signed with Island Records and with them released the albums Seven Year Itch and Stickin' to My Guns, both of which were produced by Barry Beckett and recorded at FAME Studios. That same year, she was filmed in a concert at the Wiltern Theater in Los Angeles with Joe Walsh and Albert Collins for the film Jazzvisions: Jump the Blues Away. Many of the backing musicians were top-flight players from Los Angeles: Rick Rosas (bass), Michael Huey (drums), Ed Sanford (Hammond B3 organ), Kip Noble (piano) and Josh Sklair, James's longtime guitar player.

James participated with the rap singer Def Jef on the song "Droppin' Rhymes on Drums", which mixed her jazz vocals with hip-hop. In 1992, James recorded the album The Right Time, produced by Jerry Wexler for Elektra Records. She was inducted into the Rock and Roll Hall of Fame the following year.

James signed with Private Music Records in 1993 and recorded a Billie Holiday tribute album, Mystery Lady: Songs of Billie Holiday. The album set a trend of incorporating more jazz elements in James's music. The album won James her first Grammy Award, for Best Jazz Vocal Performance, Female, in 1994. The following year, her autobiography, Rage to Survive, co-written with David Ritz, was published. Also in 1995, she recorded the album Time After Time. A Christmas album, 12 Songs of Christmas, was released in 1998.

By the mid-1990s, James's earlier music—by now considered classic—was being used in commercials, including "I Just Wanna Make Love to You", for example. After an excerpt of that song was featured in a Diet Coke advertising campaign in the UK, the song again charted, reaching the top 10 on the UK charts in 1996.

By 1998, with the release of Life, Love & the Blues, James had added as backing musicians her own sons, Donto and Sametto, on drums and bass, respectively. They were part of her touring band. She continued recording for Private Music, which released the blues album Matriarch of the Blues in 2000, on which James returned to her R&B roots.

=== 2001–2011: Later years and legacy ===
In 2001, James was inducted into the Blues Hall of Fame and the Rockabilly Hall of Fame, the latter for her contributions to the development of both rock and roll and rockabilly. Two years later, she received a Grammy Lifetime Achievement Award. On her 2004 release, Blue Gardenia, James returned to a jazz style. Her final album for Private Music, Let's Roll, released in 2005, won the Grammy Award for Best Contemporary Blues Album.

In 2004, Rolling Stone magazine ranked her number 62 on its list of the 100 Greatest Artists of All Time.

James performed at the top jazz festivals in the world, such as the Montreux Jazz Festival in 1977, 1989, 1990, and 1993. She performed nine times at the legendary Monterey Jazz Festival and five times at the San Francisco Jazz Festival. James performed at the Playboy Jazz Festival in 1990, 1997, 2004, and 2007. She performed six times at the North Sea Jazz Festival, in 1978, 1982, 1989, 1990, 1991 and 1993. James performed at the New Orleans Jazz & Heritage Festival in 2006 and 2009. She also often performed at free summer arts festivals throughout the United States.

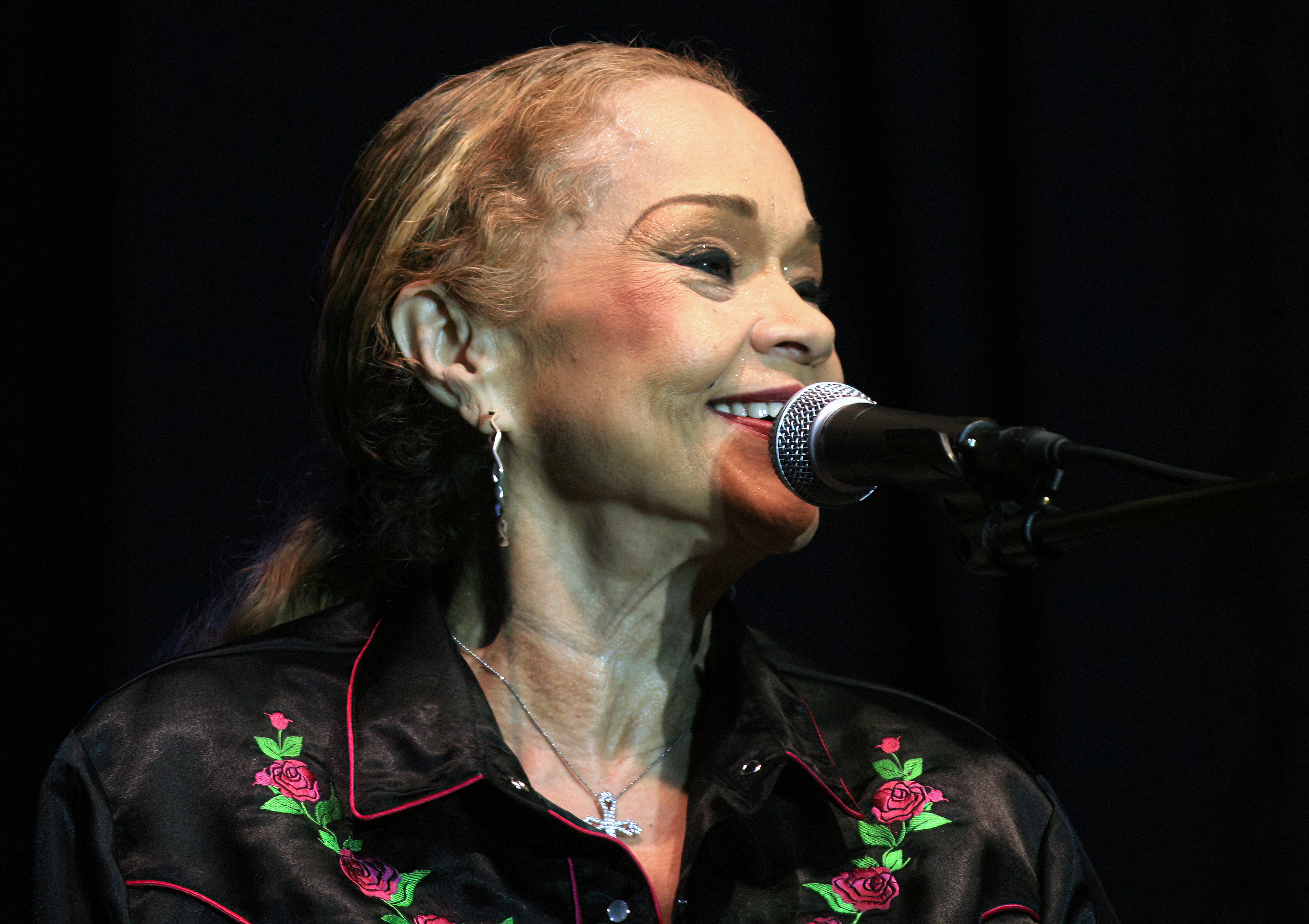
James at the 2006 Common Ground Festival in Lansing, Michigan

In 2008, James was portrayed by singer Beyoncé in the film Cadillac Records, a fictional account of Chess Records, James' label for 18 years, about how label founder and producer Leonard Chess helped the careers of James and others. The film included "At Last," performed by Beyoncé. Beyoncé was invited to perform the song at Barack Obama's inaugural ball. In the following weeks James publicly complained that Beyoncé was “singing my song,” but later added that her critical remarks were meant to be received as a joke and stemmed from personal hurt over not having been invited to the sing the song herself for the Obama inauguration. It was later reported that Alzheimer's disease and "drug-induced dementia" had contributed to her negative comments about Knowles.

In April 2009, at age 71, James made her final television appearance, performing "At Last" on the program Dancing with the Stars. The following month, James received the Soul/Blues Female Artist of the Year award from the Blues Foundation, the ninth time she won that award. James carried on touring but by 2010 had to cancel concert dates because of her gradually failing health; by this time, James was suffering from dementia and leukemia. In November 2011, she released her final album, The Dreamer, to critical acclaim. James announced her retirement at the time of its release.

James's enduring relevance was affirmed in 2011 when the Swedish DJ Avicii achieved substantial chart success with the song "Levels", which samples her 1962 song "Something's Got a Hold on Me". The same sample was used by the east coast rapper Flo Rida in his 2011 hit single "Good Feeling". Both artists issued statements of condolence upon James's death. James's original classic music again charted after these 21st-century re-interpretations.

== Style and influence ==
James possessed the vocal range of a contralto. Her musical style changed during the course of her career. At the beginning of her recording career, in the mid-1950s, James was marketed as an R&B and doo-wop singer. After signing with Chess Records in 1960, James broke through as a traditional pop-styled singer, covering jazz and pop music standards on her debut album, At Last! James's voice deepened and coarsened, moving her musical style in her later years into the genres of soul and jazz.

James was once considered one of the most overlooked blues and R&B musicians in the music history of the United States. It was not until the early 1990s, when she began receiving major industry awards from the Grammys and the Blues Foundation, that James received wide recognition. In more recent years, she has been hailed as a pioneer who helped bridge the gap between rhythm and blues and rock and roll and thereby contributed significantly to American musical history. James has influenced a wide variety of musicians, including, notably, Diana Ross, Christina Aguilera, Janis Joplin, Brandy, Bonnie Raitt, Shemekia Copeland, Sabrina Carpenter, Beth Hart, Hayley Williams of Paramore and Brent Smith of Shinedown as well as British artists The Rolling Stones, Elkie Brooks, Paloma Faith, Joss Stone, Rita Ora, Raye, Amy Winehouse, and Adele, and the Belgian singer Dani Klein.

In particular, James' song "Something's Got a Hold on Me" has been recognized in many ways. Brussels music act Vaya Con Dios covered the song on their 1990 album Night Owls. Another version, performed by Christina Aguilera, was in the 2010 film Burlesque. Pretty Lights sampled the song in "Finally Moving", followed by Avicii's dance hit "Levels", and again in Flo Rida's single "Good Feeling".

British blues band Chicken Shack recorded James' 1967 single "I'd Rather Go Blind", which ended up becoming successful for the band, with Christine McVie singing lead vocals. The single was successful enough that it garnered Christine McVie the Top Female Singer on the Melody Maker's Reader's Poll in 1969.

== Personal life ==
=== Religion ===
Through her mother, Dorothy, James was introduced to the Nation of Islam. Dorothy attended occasional meetings at Nation of Islam Temple No. 27 in Los Angeles and relayed the teachings to her daughter. However, under the care of her grandparents, James was raised Baptist. In her adult years, James and a friend began attending a Nation of Islam temple in Atlanta, where she found comfort in the preaching of Minister Louis X and a sense of "racial pride". James took on the name Jamesetta X and later joined Malcolm X’s temple in Harlem; she remained a member for about a decade. It was in Harlem that James became friends with young boxer Cassius Clay, who later changed his name to Muhammad Ali. She did not strictly follow their beliefs, saying it was "something of a fad" and the "radical, the 'in' thing to do" at the time.

=== Marriage and children ===
James was married to Artis Mills from 1969 until her death in 2012. She had two sons, Donto James and Sametto James, born to different fathers. Both of James' sons became musicians and eventually performed professionally with her; Donto played drums at Montreux in 1993 and Sametto played bass guitar circa 2003, among other performances and tours.

=== Legal difficulties and drug addiction ===
By the mid-1960s, James was addicted to heroin. To finance her habit, James bounced checks, forged prescriptions, and stole from her friends. In 1966, she was arrested for writing bad checks; she was placed on probation and ordered to pay a $500 fine. Three years later, James spent ten days in jail for violating her probation.

James was continuously in and out of rehabilitation centers, including the Tarzana Treatment Centers, in Los Angeles. Her husband, Artis, accepted responsibility when they were both arrested for heroin possession and served a 10-year prison sentence. He was released from prison in 1981.

In 1973, James was arrested for possession of heroin. The following year, she was sentenced to drug treatment instead of prison. During this period, James became addicted to methadone and would mix her doses with heroin. She was in the Tarzana Psychiatric Hospital for 17 months, starting at age 36, and went through a great struggle. In her 1995 autobiography Rage to Survive, James said that the time she spent in the hospital changed her life. However, after leaving treatment, James' substance abuse continued, particularly after developing a relationship with a man who was also using drugs.

In 2010, James received treatment for a dependency on painkillers.

== Illness and death ==
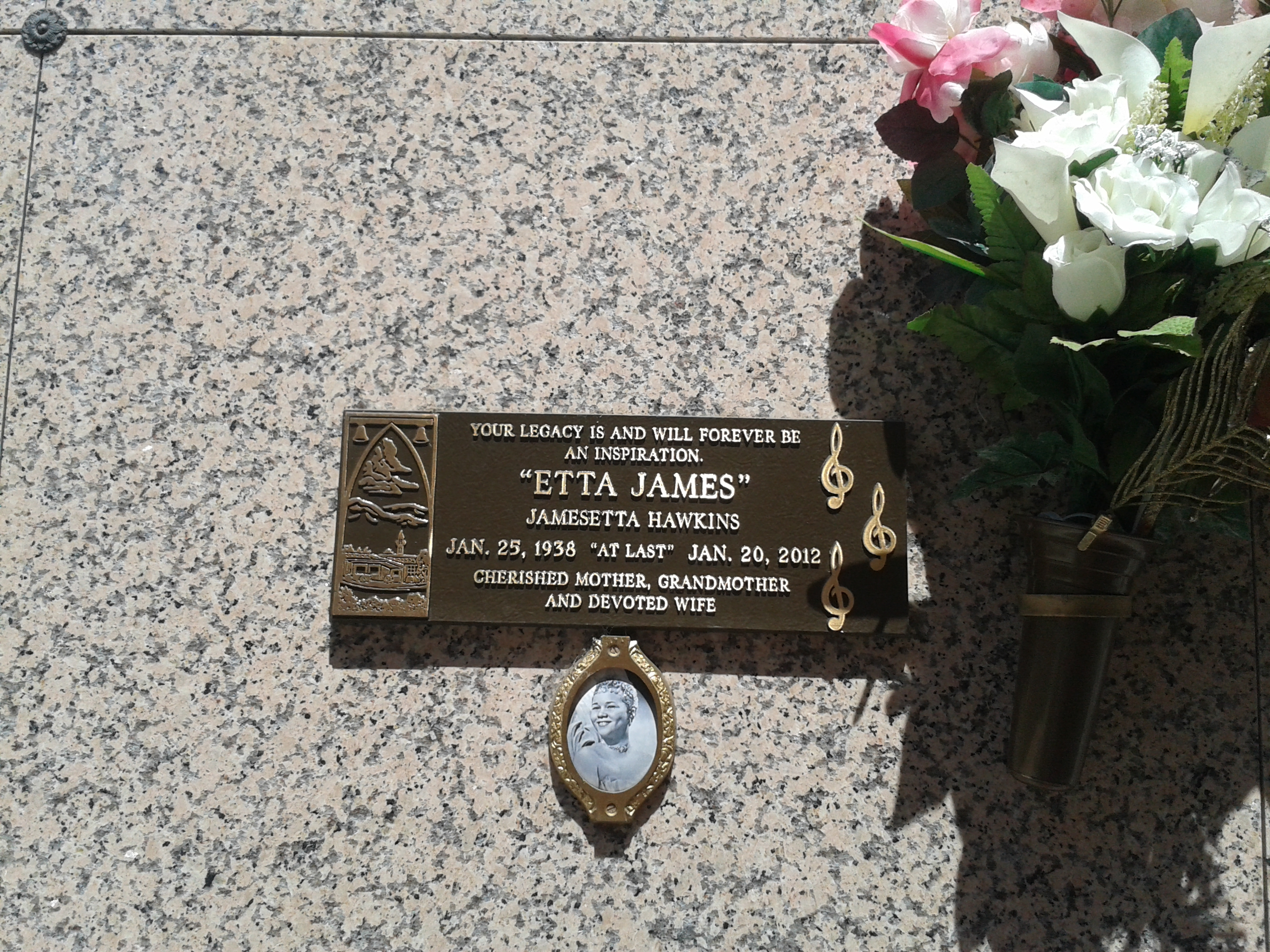
James' crypt at Inglewood Park Cemetery

James was hospitalized in January 2010 to treat an infection caused by MRSA, a bacterium resistant to many antibiotics. During her hospitalization, her son Donto revealed to the public that, in 2008, she had been diagnosed with Alzheimer's disease.

In 2011, James was diagnosed with leukemia. Artis Mills was appointed sole conservator of the James estate and tasked with overseeing her medical care. James died on January 20, 2012, five days before her 74th birthday, at Riverside Community Hospital in Riverside, California. Her death came three days after that of Johnny Otis, the man who had discovered her in the 1950s. Thirty-six days after her death, James' sideman Red Holloway also died.

James' funeral was presided over by the Reverend Al Sharpton and took place at Greater Bethany Community Church in Gardena, California, eight days after her death. Stevie Wonder and Christina Aguilera gave musical tributes. James was buried at Inglewood Park Cemetery in Los Angeles County, California.

== Musical ==
Australian singer Vika Bull played James in the hit musical At Last: The Etta James Story, which premiered in 2013, and toured Australia and New Zealand. It returned in February 2016, first playing at the Arts Centre Playhouse, Melbourne, before doing a third season at The Sydney Opera House in July of that year. In 2017 the musical toured the UK, playing to sold-out audiences and good reviews in London, Liverpool, Manchester, and other venues. It was performed at the Cadogan Hall in October 2018.

== Discography ==
Studio albums

- At Last! (1960)
- The Second Time Around (1961)
- Etta James (1962)
- Etta James Sings for Lovers (1962)
- Etta James Top Ten (1963)
- The Queen of Soul (1965)
- Call My Name (1966)
- Tell Mama (1968)
- Etta James Sings Funk (1970)
- Losers Weepers (1971)
- Etta James (1973)
- Come a Little Closer (1974)
- Etta Is Betta Than Evvah! (1976)
- Deep in the Night (1978)
- Changes (1980)
- Seven Year Itch (1988)
- Stickin' to My Guns (1990)
- The Right Time (1992)
- Mystery Lady: Songs of Billie Holiday (1994)
- Time After Time (1995)
- Love's Been Rough on Me (1997)
- Life, Love & the Blues (1998)
- Heart of a Woman (1999)
- Matriarch of the Blues (2000)
- Blue Gardenia (2001)
- Let's Roll (2003)
- Blues to the Bone (2004)
- All the Way (2006)
- The Dreamer (2011)

== Awards ==
Beginning in 1989, James received over 30 awards and recognitions from eight different organizations, including the Rock and Roll Hall of Fame and Museum and the National Academy of Recording Arts and Sciences which organizes the Grammys.

In 1989, the newly formed Rhythm and Blues Foundation included James in their first Pioneer Awards for artists whose "lifelong contributions have been instrumental in the development of Rhythm & Blues music". The following year, she received an NAACP Image Award, which is given for "outstanding achievements and performances of people of color in the arts;" it was an award James cherished as it "was coming from my own people". In 2020, she was inducted into the National Rhythm & Blues Hall of Fame.

- In 1993, James was inducted into the Rock and Roll Hall of Fame
- In 2001, James was inducted into the Rockabilly Hall of Fame
- In 2003, James received a star on the Hollywood Walk of Fame at 7080 Hollywood Blvd
- In 2005, James was inducted into Hollywood's Rockwalk
- In 2006, James received the Billboard R&B Founders Award

=== Grammys ===
The Grammy Awards are awarded annually by the National Academy of Recording Arts and Sciences. James received six Grammy Awards. Her first was in 1995, when she was awarded Best Jazz Vocal Performance for the album Mystery Lady, which consisted of covers of Billie Holiday songs. Two other albums have also won awards, Let's Roll (Best Contemporary Blues Album) in 2003, and Blues to the Bone (Best Traditional Blues Album) in 2004. Two of James' early songs have been given Grammy Hall of Fame Awards for "qualitative or historical significance": "At Last", in 1999, and "The Wallflower (Dance with Me, Henry)" in 2008. In 2003, she was given the Grammy Lifetime Achievement Award.

Year	Nominee / work	Award	Result
1961	All I Could Do Was Cry	Best Rhythm & Blues Performance	Nominated
1962	Fool That I Am	Best Rhythm & Blues Performance	Nominated
1968	Tell Mama	Best R&B Solo Vocal Performance, Female	Nominated
1969	Security	Best R&B Solo Vocal Performance, Female	Nominated
1974	Etta James	Best R&B Solo Vocal Performance, Female	Nominated
1975	St. Louis Blues	Best R&B Solo Vocal Performance, Female	Nominated
1989	Seven Year Itch	Best Contemporary Blues Recording	Nominated
1991	Stickin' to My Guns	Best Contemporary Blues Recording	Nominated
1993	The Right Time	Best Contemporary Blues Recording	Nominated
1995	Mystery Lady: Songs of Billie Holiday	Best Jazz Vocal Performance	Won
1999	At Last	Grammy Hall of Fame Award	Inducted
1999	Life, Love & the Blues	Best Contemporary Blues Album	Nominated
2000	Heart of a Woman	Best Jazz Vocal Performance	Nominated
2002	Matriarch of the Blues	Best Contemporary Blues Album	Nominated
2003	Etta James	Grammy Lifetime Achievement Award	Inducted
2004	Let's Roll	Best Contemporary Blues Album	Won
2005	Blues to the Bone	Best Traditional Blues Album	Won
2008	The Wallflower	Grammy Hall of Fame Award	Inducted

=== Blues Foundation ===
The members of the Blues Foundation, a nonprofit organization set up in Memphis, Tennessee, to foster the blues and its heritage, have nominated James for a Blues Music Award nearly every year since its founding in 1980; and she received some form of Blues Female Artist of the Year award 14 times since 1989, continuously from 1999 to 2007. Her albums Life, Love, & the Blues (1999), Burnin' Down the House (2003), and Let's Roll (2004) were awarded Soul/Blues Album of the Year, and in 2001 she was inducted into the Blues Hall of Fame.

== Books ==
- Rage To Survive: The Etta James Story (2003) by David Ritz with Etta James ISBN 9780306812620
- American Legends: The Life of Etta James (2014) by Charles River Editors, ISBN 9781505670493
