= Mirai Nagasu =

American figure skater (born 1993)

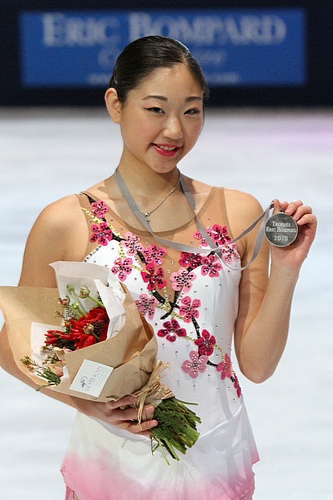
- Nagasu at the 2010 Trophée Eric Bompard

Personal information
- Full name: Mirai Aileen Nagasu
- Born: April 16, 1993 (age 33) Montebello, California, U.S
- Home town: Arcadia, California, U.S
- Height: 5 ft 4 in (1.63 m)

Figure skating career
- Country: United States
- Skating club: Pasadena FSC
- Began skating: 1998
- Retired: 2020

Medal record
Event	Gold medal – first place	Silver medal – second place	Bronze medal – third place
Olympic Games	0	0	1
Four Continents Championships	0	1	2
U.S. Championships	1	2	2
World Junior Championships	0	1	1
Junior Grand Prix Final	1	0	0
Medal list
Olympic Games
Bronze medal – third place	2018 Pyeongchang	Team
Four Continents Championships
Silver medal – second place	2016 Taipei	Singles
Bronze medal – third place	2011 Taipei	Singles
Bronze medal – third place	2017 Gangneung	Singles
U.S. Championships
Gold medal – first place	2008 St. Paul	Singles
Silver medal – second place	2010 Spokane	Singles
Silver medal – second place	2018 San Jose	Singles
Bronze medal – third place	2011 Greensboro	Singles
Bronze medal – third place	2014 Boston	Singles
World Junior Championships
Silver medal – second place	2007 Oberstdorf	Singles
Bronze medal – third place	2008 Sofia	Singles
Junior Grand Prix Final
Gold medal – first place	2007–08 Gdańsk	Singles

Mirai Aileen Nagasu (長洲 未来, Nagasu Mirai; born April 16, 1993) is an American former competitive figure skater. She is a 2018 Olympic Games team event bronze medalist, three-time Four Continents medalist (silver in 2016, bronze in 2011 and 2017), the 2007 JGP Final champion, a two-time World Junior medalist (silver in 2007, bronze in 2008), and a seven-time U.S. national medalist (gold in 2008, silver in 2010 and 2018, bronze in 2011 and 2014, pewter in 2016 and 2017).

In 2008, Nagasu became the youngest woman since Tara Lipinski in 1997 to win the U.S. senior ladies' title, and the second-youngest in history at the time. She is the first lady since Joan Tozzer in 1937 and 1938 to win the junior and senior national titles in consecutive years. Nagasu represented the United States at the 2010 Winter Olympics at the age of 16 and placed 4th in the ladies' event. In 2017, she landed the difficult triple Axel jump for the first time in international competition at the 2017 CS U.S. Classic. During her free skate in the team event at the 2018 Olympics, she became the first American ladies' singles skater to land a triple Axel at the Olympics, and the third woman from any country to do so. This also made her the first senior ladies skater ever to land eight triple jumps (the maximum allowed in the free skate under the Zayak rule) cleanly in international competition.

== Personal life ==
Mirai Aileen Nagasu was born on April 16, 1993, in Montebello, California, and raised in Arcadia, California. Her parents own Restaurant Kiyosuzu, a Japanese sushi restaurant in Arcadia. They are immigrants from Japan and their daughter had dual citizenship but was required by Japanese law to relinquish it before her 22nd birthday, so she chose U.S. citizenship. Nagasu speaks a mixture of Japanese and English at home with her parents. Her mother, Ikuko, was diagnosed with thyroid cancer in the fall of 2009. Mirai (未来) means "future" in Japanese, while her last name is written as 長洲 in kanji.

Nagasu graduated from Foothills Middle School in the spring of 2007 and entered Arcadia High School in the fall of 2007. In 2009, she began attending an online high school. She graduated from the Capistrano Connections Academy in June 2011 and was accepted into the University of California, Irvine, but said the commute was not feasible. Around 2015, she enrolled at the University of Colorado Colorado Springs and has taken courses in the business field. Nagasu graduated from UCCS with a degree in business administration in December 2020.

During the 2015–16 NHL season, Nagasu worked for the Colorado Avalanche as an ice girl and worked as a franchise ambassador at events in the Greater Denver such as learn to skate programs.

In June 2024, Nagasu announced her engagement to Michael Bramante (a year prior) and the birth of her son, Tai.

== Skating career ==
=== Early career ===
Nagasu began skating at age five. She admires Yuna Kim, Michelle Kwan and Mao Asada.

In the 2002–03 season, she competed on the juvenile level. She placed fifth at the Southwest Pacific Regional Championships.

In the 2003–04 season, Nagasu moved up to the intermediate level. She placed fourth at the Southwest Pacific Regional Championships. She competed at the 2004 U.S. Junior Championships, the national-level championships for Juvenile and Intermediate skaters. She placed eighth in her qualifying group and did not advance to the short program. In the 2004–05 season, she remained on the intermediate level. She won the Southwest Pacific Regional Championships. At the 2005 U.S. Junior Championships, she placed 11th in her qualifying group and did not advance to the short program.

For the 2005–06 season, Nagasu advanced to the novice level, the lowest level that competes at the U.S. Championships. Skaters qualify for Nationals by placing in the top four at regionals and then going on to place in the top four at Sectionals. At the Southwest Pacific Regional Championships, the first step to qualifying for Nationals, Nagasu placed fifth. She did not advance to Sectionals.

Nagasu was coached by Sandy Gollihugh for most of her early career. She changed her coach to Charlene Wong in October 2006. During this period, Wong was her primary coach. Nagasu's secondary coaches included Sashi Kuchiki, Sondra Holmes, Bob Paul, and Jim Yorke, with whom she worked on a once a week basis to refine various details of her skating.

=== 2006–07 season: Silver at Junior Worlds ===
In the 2006–07 season, Nagasu moved up to the junior level. She won the Southwest Pacific Regional Championships and advanced to win the Pacific Coast Sectional Championships. This win at Sectionals qualified her for the U.S. Figure Skating Championships, which would be her first time competing at the event and only her second national-level competition.

At the U.S. Nationals, Nagasu won the Junior level short program 0.39 ahead of second-place finisher Caroline Zhang, who came to the event as the reigning Junior Grand Prix Final champion and the heavy favorite. After placing first in the free skate by a margin of 3.19 points over Zhang, Nagasu won the overall title with a combined score of 155.46.

At the Junior Worlds Nagasu skated in the first half of the ladies' short program due to her lack of international skating experience which meant she had no ISU Personal Best on record. Ranked second behind Zhang in both segments of the competition (-1.95 points in the short, -3.46 points in the free), she won the silver medal with a total score 5.41 points less than champion Zhang and 6.69 points greater than bronze medalist Ashley Wagner. Zhang, Nagasu, and Wagner constituted the first ever sweep by the United States of the World Junior ladies' podium.

=== 2007–08 season: Senior national title ===
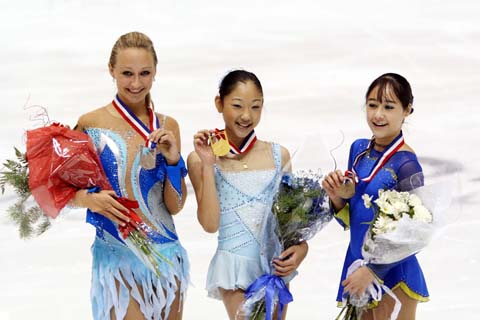
Nagasu (center) at the 2007 JGP United States podium.

For the 2007–08 season, Nagasu moved up to the senior level nationally, but remained junior internationally. At the 2007–08 ISU Junior Grand Prix event in Lake Placid, New York, the first Junior Grand Prix competition of her career, Nagasu won both the short and free programs to win the gold medal with a 26.47-point lead over silver medalist Alexe Gilles. Similarly at her second event, the Junior Grand Prix event in Zagreb, Croatia, Nagasu won both the short and free programs to win the event with an 11.08-point lead over silver medalist Jenni Vähämaa. These two wins qualified her for the Junior Grand Prix Final.

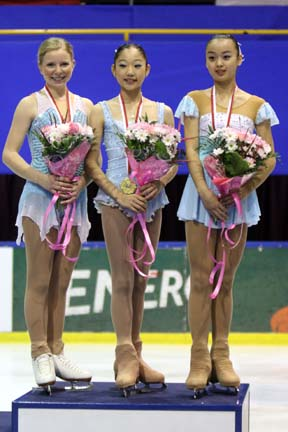
Nagasu (center) at the 2007–08 Junior Grand Prix Final podium.

In the fall of 2007, after winning her two JGP events, Nagasu took part in the International Counter Match "made for television" event in Japan, competing as part of Team USA against Team Japan. At the 2007–08 Junior Grand Prix Final in Gdańsk, Poland, she won the short program by a margin of 4.72 points over the second-place finisher, Yuki Nishino. In the free skate, Nagasu placed second by 4.81 points behind Rachael Flatt. Nagasu won the title overall by 2.43 points ahead of silver medalist Flatt.

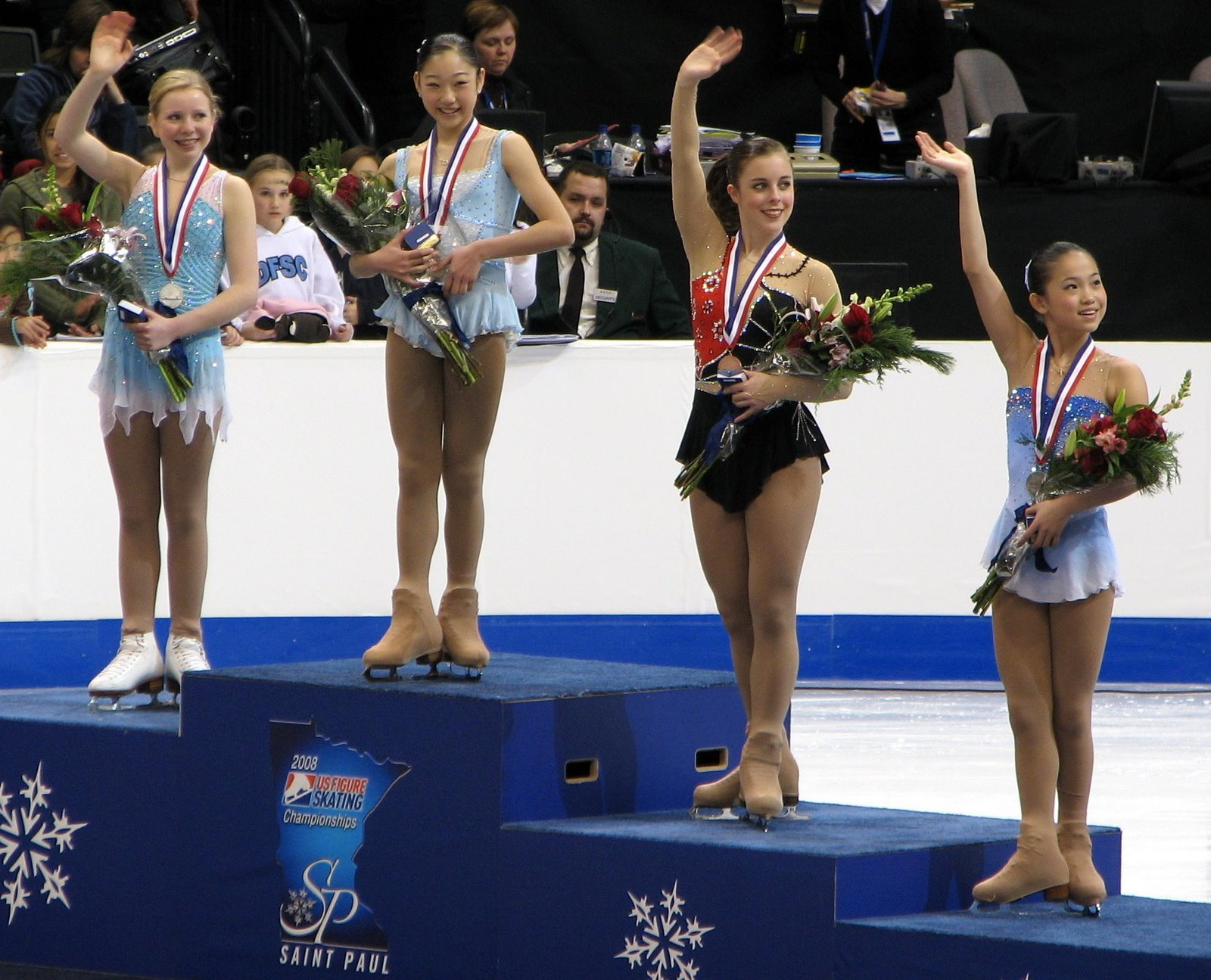
Nagasu (second left) at the 2008 U.S. Championships podium.

Skating as a senior, Nagasu won the short program at U.S. Nationals, 5.08 points ahead of second-place finisher Ashley Wagner. During the program, Nagasu landed a triple Lutz-triple toe loop combination for the first time in competition. She placed third in the free skate, 5.64 points behind Rachael Flatt and 3.23 points behind Wagner, and finished first overall by a margin of 1.68 over silver medalist Flatt. Nagasu became the first skater to win back-to-back U.S. junior and senior ladies' titles since Joan Tozzer in 1937 and 1938. She also became the second-youngest American senior ladies' champion in history, after Tara Lipinski.

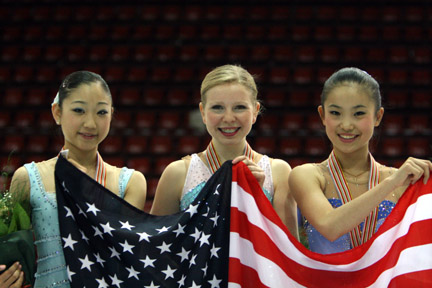
Nagasu (left) at the 2008 World Junior Championships podium.

Although now a senior national champion, Nagasu did not meet the International Skating Union's age criteria to compete at the World Championships. Of the four top finishers at the 2008 U.S. Championships, only Ashley Wagner was old enough to compete at senior Worlds, with the other medalists sent to Junior Worlds in Sofia. In Bulgaria, Nagasu outscored Zhang by 2.47 points in the short program. She placed third in the free skate, 14.21 points behind Flatt and 11.42 points behind Zhang. For the second year in a row, Nagasu was part of an American sweep of the podium, winning the bronze medal 8.95 points behind silver medalist Zhang, and 9.30 behind Flatt, who took the gold.

During the off-season, she toured in Japan. She was a recipient of a Michael Weiss Foundation scholarship, which is for young American figure skaters.

=== 2008–09 season: Senior international debut ===
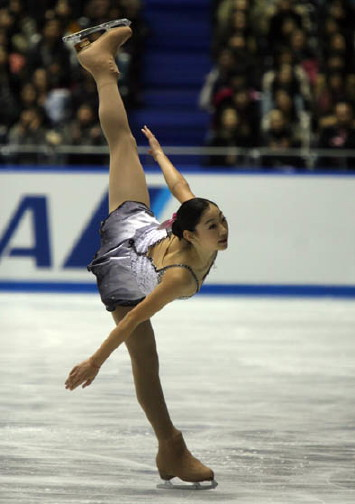
Nagasu performs an arabesque spiral during her short program to City Lights at the 2008 NHK Trophy.

For the 2008–09 season, Nagasu moved up to the senior level internationally. She had injured her ankle and had had a significant growth spurt. In her senior Grand Prix debut, Nagasu placed fifth at the 2008 Skate America. At the 2008 NHK Trophy, Nagasu finished in eighth place.

At the U.S. Nationals in January, Nagasu finished fifth overall after a free skate that included two downgraded triple flip jumps.

Nagasu was selected to compete at the 2009 World Junior Championships but decided not to participate due to a foot injury. She worked as a television commentator in Japanese for Fuji TV during the 2009 World Championships, which were held in Los Angeles.

In May 2009, Nagasu changed her coach to Frank Carroll. She also worked with ballet coach Galina Barinova.

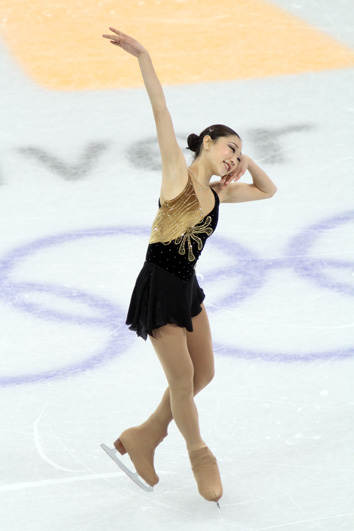
Nagasu performs during her short program to the Pirates of the Caribbean at the 2010 Winter Olympics.

=== 2009–10 season ===
For the 2009–10 season, Nagasu was assigned to the 2009 Cup of China and the 2009 Skate Canada International Grand Prix events. She won the short program at the 2009 Cup of China, but placed sixth in the free skate to finish fifth overall. A few weeks later she competed at the 2009 Skate Canada, where she finished fourth.

In January 2010, Nagasu competed at U.S. Nationals, where she placed first in the short program with a score 70.06 points. She placed third in the free skate, winning the silver medal behind Rachael Flatt. Following the event, she was nominated to represent the United States at the 2010 Winter Olympics and was also selected to compete at the World Championships along with Flatt.

During the 2010 Winter Olympics, she placed sixth in the short program. She placed fifth in the free skate and fourth overall, earning new personal bests for the free skate score and combined total. At Worlds, Nagasu led the short program with a personal best score of 70.40 points, positioned ahead of Mao Asada by 2.32 points. Ranked eleventh in the free skate, she finished in seventh place overall.

During the off-season, she toured in the show Stars on Ice.

=== 2010–11 season: Bronze at Four Continents ===
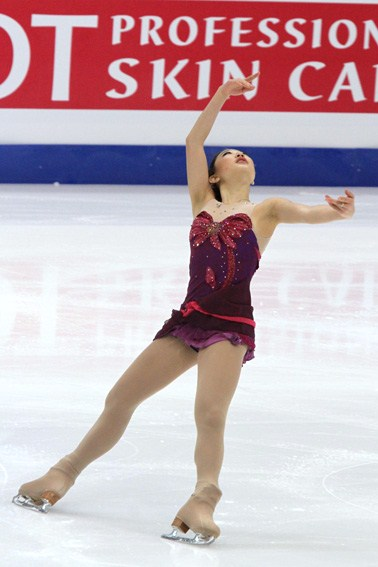
Nagasu performs a spread eagle during her short program to The Witches of Eastwick and Un Sospiro at the 2011 Four Continents.

A stress fracture kept Nagasu out of training for a month during the summer. She returned to practice in September 2010. Nagasu started her 2010–11 Grand Prix season finishing fourth at the 2010 Cup of China. At the 2010 Trophée Eric Bompard, she placed second in the short program. In the free skate, Nagasu had trouble on her layback spin. She still earned enough points to win the free skate, scoring 109.07, and won the silver overall, her first senior Grand Prix medal. If she had executed the spin correctly, she would have won the gold.

At U.S. Nationals, Nagasu was in first place after the short program with a small lead. In the long program, she received zero points for a botched flying sit spin and finished third overall to win the bronze medal. Nagasu was assigned to the 2011 Four Continents, where she won the bronze medal with an overall score of 189.46. She was the first alternate to the 2011 World Championships but did not compete despite Rachael Flatt being injured.

Looking back on the season, Nagasu said, "Getting my body back into shape [after the injury] was tough. I really did not get back into shape until Four Continents, where I did the best I could." Focus had also been an issue; "She was thinking of some things that didn't go so well before or something that was coming up -- all kinds of different thoughts instead of getting out there and doing each thing that was coming along and just doing the program", according to Carroll.

=== 2011–12 season ===
Nagasu began the 2011–12 season at the Nebelhorn Trophy, where she won her first senior international title. At her 2011–12 Grand Prix assignments, Nagasu came in fifth at the 2011 Skate Canada International and won the silver medal at the 2011 Cup of China.

Nagasu finished seventh at the 2012 U.S. National Championships. At the time, she was coached several days a week by Frank Carroll in Cathedral City, California (near Palm Springs), and also worked with Rafael Arutyunyan in Lake Arrowhead, with Galina Barinova in Artesia, and on her own in Pasadena.

In April 2012, Nagasu ended her collaboration with Carroll because of the distance to the training location. Carroll said: "The two-hour drive each way was too much. She was exhausted by the time she got here." She decided to be coached by Wendy Olson and Amy Evidente at the Pickwick Ice rink in Burbank, California, which was a short drive from her home.

=== 2012–13 season ===
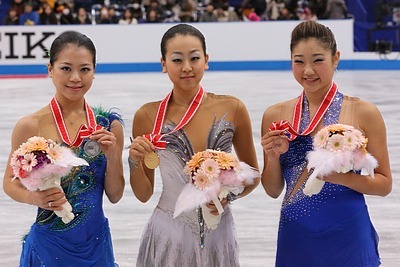
Nagasu (right) with Akiko Suzuki (left) and Mao Asada (center) at the 2012 NHK Trophy podium.

In the 2012–13 season, Nagasu won the bronze medal at the 2012 Finlandia Trophy. At the 2012 Cup of China, she placed third in the short program after she under-rotated her triple-triple combination. In the free skate, she had several under-rotated jumps and placed fourth in that segment, finishing fourth overall. Nagasu had the opportunity to compete at the 2012 NHK Trophy after Alissa Czisny withdrew. She won the bronze medal at the event.

Nagasu had the flu before the U.S. Nationals. She finished seventh overall after under-rotating multiple jumps in her long program.

Nagasu was listed as the alternate to the 2013 ISU World Team Trophy.

=== 2013–14 season ===
Nagasu began the 2013–14 season at the 2013 Finlandia Trophy, finishing fourth. She was eighth at her first Grand Prix event, the 2013 NHK Trophy. At the 2013 Rostelecom Cup, she placed fourth in the short program, third in the free skate, and won the bronze medal.

After the Rostelecom Cup, Nagasu parted ways with her coaches Wendy Olson and Amy Evidente and started training in Okayama, Japan where Takashi Mura became her coach.

Nagasu won the bronze medal at the 2014 U.S. Championships behind gold medalist Gracie Gold and silver medalist Polina Edmunds. Although the United States was able to send a three-woman team to the ladies' singles figure skating event at the 2014 Winter Olympics in Sochi, Russia, U.S. Figure Skating awarded the third position on the team to Wagner despite her fourth-place finish behind Nagasu, due to Wagner's stronger international competitive record. It was reported in the January 12, 2014 televised broadcast of the championship that Nagasu would file a protest of the association's decision. However, The New York Times later reported that, after inquiring about the appeal process, Nagasu accepted the decision of U.S. Figure Skating, although she disagreed with it. Nagasu was assigned to the Four Continents Championships, placing tenth.

In March 2014, Nagasu moved to Colorado Springs, Colorado to train after feeling the need for a "change in scenery" and chose Tom Zakrajsek as her coach a month later.

=== 2014–15 season ===
Nagasu was assigned to the 2014 Skate America and 2014 Rostelecom Cup for the Grand Prix series. She started off her season by finishing sixth at U.S. International Figure Skating Classic. At Skate America, Nagasu finished sixth. At Rostelecom Cup, she finished fourth.

At the 2015 U.S. Championships, Nagasu skated a solid short program and was in fourth place going into the long program. However, she placed 12th in the free skate after crashing into the boards and injuring her knee. She received several downgrades for under rotations on her jumps. Nagasu finished 10th overall.

In the spring of 2015, Nagasu briefly worked with Alexei Mishin on her jumps when he and his students went to temporarily train at the Broadmoor Skating Club, the rink Nagasu trains at, in Colorado Springs, for a week due to the lack of ice time they were getting in Saint Petersburg.

=== 2015–16 season: Silver at Four Continents ===
For the 2015–16 Grand Prix series, Nagasu was assigned to compete at 2015 NHK Trophy. She opened her season by finishing fifth at 2015 Nebelhorn Trophy. She then won the 2015 Ice Challenge. In late November, Nagasu finished fifth at the 2015 NHK Trophy.

Nagasu suffered from an equipment malfunction at the 2016 U.S. Championships; her right boot (her landing foot) ripped during the short program and remained loose through the rest of the program. Nagasu was nonetheless able to complete her skate, and the boot was repaired in time for the free skate. She ultimately finished fourth, winning the pewter medal, and was assigned to compete at the 2016 Four Continents Championships.

At the 2016 Four Continents Championships in Taipei, Nagasu placed third in the short program and second in the free skate. Her combined score of 193.86 at the competition earned her a new personal best, and won her the silver medal behind Satoko Miyahara. In March, she was called up to replace the injured Polina Edmunds at the 2016 World Championships in Boston, where she finished 10th.

=== 2016–17 season: Bronze at Four Continents ===
For the 2016–17 skating season, Mirai Nagasu was assigned to 2016 Skate Canada International and 2016 NHK Trophy. Before her GP events, she won two Challenger Series medals. Bronze at the 2016 Lombardia Trophy and gold at the 2016 Autumn Classic, where she scored a new personal best short program, with a score of 73.40. She was also assigned to 2017 Four Continents. She was fifth after the short with a score of 62.91, after she under-rotated her triple loop. However, she fought back and was 2nd in the free with a score of 132.04, a personal best, and finally finished 3rd with a total score of 194.95, another personal best.

=== 2017–2018 season ===
Nagasu began the 2017–2018 season at the 2017 CS U.S. International Figure Skating Classic, placing third in the short program and second in the free skate, and winning her the silver medal. She landed the triple Axel jump for the first time. She then competed in the 2017 Japan Open as part of Team North America and came in fourth in personal and third for team. For the Grand Prix series, she was assigned to compete at the 2017 Rostelecom Cup and the 2017 NHK Trophy. She finished ninth at the Rostelecom Cup, and fourth at the NHK Trophy.

Nagasu competed at the 2018 U.S. Figure Skating Championships and won the silver after placing second in both the short program and the free skate. She, with teammates Bradie Tennell and Karen Chen, were named to the 2018 US Winter Olympic Team for the 2018 Winter Olympics. It was Nagasu's second appearance in the Winter Olympics, after an 8-year absence.

At the 2018 Winter Olympics, Nagasu competed in the free skate portion of the figure skating team event. On February 11, 2018, during the team event free skate, Nagasu became the first American woman, and third woman overall, to land a triple Axel at an Olympic Games. The triple Axel jump allowed Nagasu to be the first woman to land eight clean triple jumps in a long program at World championship or Olympic competition. She landed one triple Axel, one triple Lutz, two triple flip jumps, one triple loop, one triple Salchow and two triple toe jumps. Because of the Zayak Rule, eight is the maximum number of triple jumps any skater can attempt in a long program. She won a bronze medal in the team event as part of the U.S. team. She placed 10th in the Ladies event, during which she again planned eight triple jumps but landed only six.

=== 2018–2019 season ===
Nagasu skipped the 2018–2019 season. Later, Nagasu revealed that she underwent a surgery to repair a torn labrum in her hip, which had bothered her since she started practicing the triple Axel jump.

=== 2019–2020 season ===
Nagasu competed in both the short and free programs at the 2019 Aurora Games.

As of December 2020, Nagasu announced that she was "most likely done competing" and is currently working as a coach at the North Star Figure Skating Club in Westboro, Massachusetts.

== Skating technique and style ==
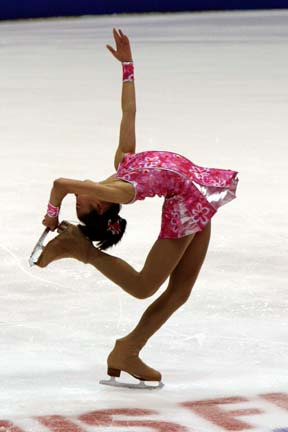
Nagasu performs a catch-foot layback spin during her short program to I Got Rhythm at the 2007 Junior Grand Prix, USA.

Nagasu is considered a strong spinner, and has received a straight +3.00 grade of execution for her layback spin. She often performs the Biellmann spin with a variation in which her hands are on the boot of her skate instead of the blade.

Nagasu has worked on improving her jumps to avoid under-rotations. She has added a triple Axel jump to her programs, landing two fully rotated triple Axel jumps at the 2017 CS U.S. International Figure Skating Classic with the negative grade of execution. She is the second US woman skater to have landed a triple Axel jump internationally after Tonya Harding. In 2018, she became the first U.S. woman skater to have landed the triple Axel in an Olympic competition.

Nagasu has stated that the athletic side of figure skating had come naturally to her and she has learned to love the artistic side of the sport.

== Programs ==
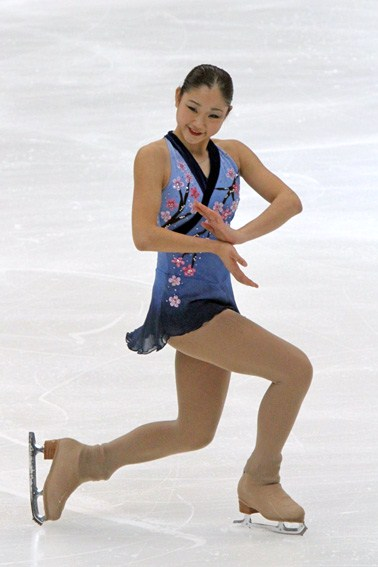
Nagasu competes at the 2011 Four Continents.

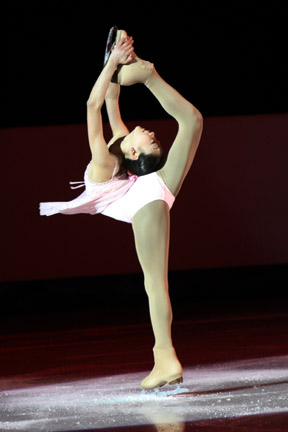
Nagasu performs a Biellmann spin variation during her exhibition to A Dream Is a Wish Your Heart Makes at the 2008 World Junior Figure Skating Championships.

Season	Short program	Free skating	Exhibition
2022–2023		Warriors by Imagine Dragons	
2019–2020	Brotsjor by Ólafur Arnalds	Old Skin by Ólafur Arnalds	
2017–2018	Nocturne No. 20 in C-sharp minor by Frédéric Chopin choreo. by Jeffrey Buttle	Miss Saigon by Claude-Michel Schönberg choreo. by Jeffrey Buttle	No Good Deed (from Wicked) by Stephen Schwartz performed by Idina Menzel; Body Language by Queen
2016–2017	Nocturne No. 20 in C-sharp minor by Frédéric Chopin choreo. by Jeffrey Buttle	The Winner Takes It All performed by Sarah Dawn Finer choreo. by David Wilson	Shake It Out by Florence + the Machine; It Keeps You Runnin' by Michael McDonald
2015–2016	Demons by Imagine Dragons performed by Sam Tsui choreo. by Catarina Lindgren	The Great Gatsby; Back to Black performed by Beyoncé; Catgroove by Parov Stelar; Young and Beautiful by Lana Del Rey; Bang Bang by will.i.am choreo. by Catarina Lindgren	I Put a Spell on You performed by Annie Lennox; Demons by Imagine Dragons performed by Sam Tsui choreo. by Adam Rippon
2014–2015	Rhapsody on a Theme of Paganini, Op. 43 "Variation 18" by Sergei Rachmaninoff choreo. by Adam Rippon, Tom Dickson	Madama Butterfly by Giacomo Puccini choreo. by Adam Rippon, Tom Dickson	Demons by Imagine Dragons performed by Sam Tsui choreo. by Adam Rippon
2013–2014	The Man I Love by George Gershwin choreo. by Cindy Stuart	James Bond music by various artists choreo. by Cindy Stuart	On Golden Pond by Dave Grusin choreo. by Adam Rippon; Demons by Imagine Dragons performed by Sam Tsui choreo. by Adam Rippon
2012–2013	Downhill Special by Benny Goodman choreo. by Susan Austin	Symphony No. 3 in C Minor, Op 78 by Camille Saint-Saëns choreo. by Susan Austin	Crazy Dreams by Megan Hilty
2011–2012	Danzarin by Tango Lorca choreo. by Lori Nichol	Adagio of Spartacus and Phrygia (from Ballet Suite No. 2); Variations of Aegina and Bacchanalia (from Ballet Suite No. 1) by Aram Khachaturian choreo. by Lori Nichol	Fireflies by Owl City
2010–2011	The Witches of Eastwick by John Williams; Un Sospiro by Franz Liszt choreo. by Lori Nichol	Memoirs of a Geisha by John Williams choreo. by Lori Nichol	Fireflies by Owl City
2009–2010	Pirates of the Caribbean: Dead Man's Chest by Hans Zimmer, Klaus Badelt; Davy Jones; Jack Sparrow; He's A Pirate; Fragile Dreams by Joe Hisaishi choreo. by Lori Nichol	Carmen Fantaisie by Franz Waxman; Carmen & Dance Boheme by Georges Bizet; Adagio from Carmen Suite by Rodion Shchedrin choreo. by Lori Nichol	Seven Day Fool by Jully Black choreo. by Lori Nichol; Faith by Jordin Sparks choreo. by Lori Nichol
2008–2009	City Lights by Charlie Chaplin choreo. by Lori Nichol	Caprice Fantastique by Erich Wolfgang Korngold; Fairy Tale and Devil's Beauties by Francois Dompierre; Orpheus in the Underworld by Jacques Offenbach choreo. by Lori Nichol	You Can't Hurry Love by The Supremes choreo. by Lori Nichol; At the Beginning by Donna Lewis, Richard Marx choreo. by Lori Nichol
2007–2008	I Got Rhythm by George Gershwin arranged by Fazıl Say choreo. by Lori Nichol	Coppélia by Léo Delibes choreo. by Lori Nichol	A Dream Is a Wish Your Heart Makes by Disney Channel Circle of Stars choreo. by Susan Austin; Don't Stop Me Now by Queen choreo. by Lori Nichol
2006–2007	Shout and Feel It by Benny Goodman choreo. by Susan Austin	American Quartet by Antonín Dvořák choreo. by Susan Austin	A Dream Is a Wish Your Heart Makes by Disney Channel Circle of Stars choreo. by Susan Austin; Shout and Feel It by Benny Goodman choreo. by Susan Austin

== Records and achievements ==
- Third woman to land eight triple jumps in the free skate (3A, 3F+3T, 3S, 2A+3T+2T, 3Lz+2T, 3F, 3Lo) at the 2018 Winter Olympics team event, behind Mao Asada and Rika Kihira of Japan. First woman to land eight clean triple jumps in a senior international free skate without receiving any downgrades or edge calls from the technical panel.

== Competitive highlights ==
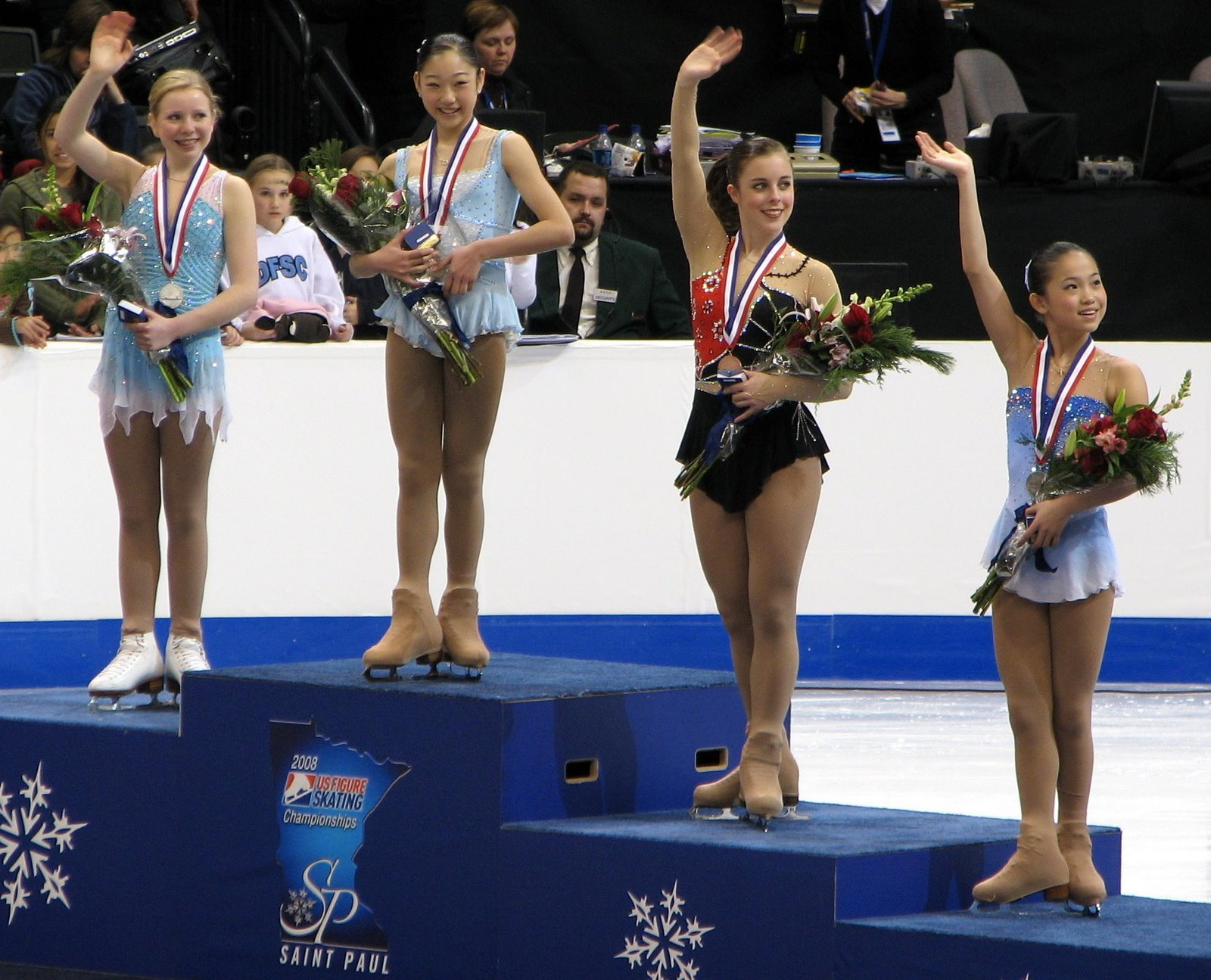
Nagasu (center) in the 2008 U.S. Championships ladies' podium

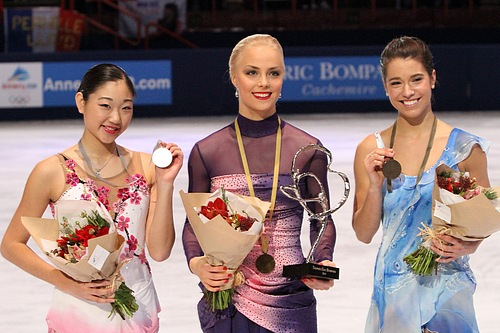
Nagasu (left) at the 2010 Trophée Éric Bompard podium

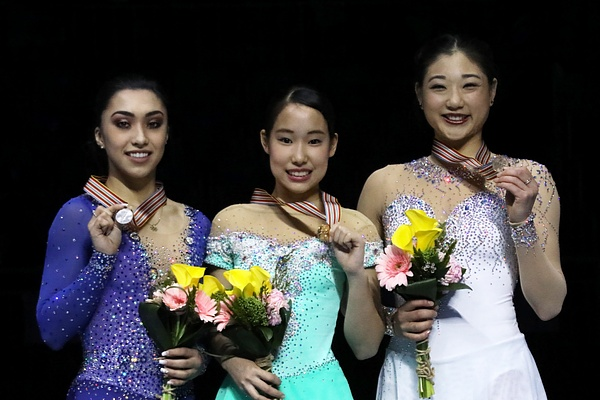
Nagasu (right) at the 2017 Four Continents podium

GP: Grand Prix; CS: Challenger Series; JGP: Junior Grand Prix

=== 2006–07 to present ===
International
Event	06–07	07–08	08–09	09–10	10–11	11–12	12–13	13–14	14–15	15–16	16–17	17–18	19–20	22–23
Olympics				4th								10th		
Worlds				7th						10th		10th		
Four Continents					3rd			10th		2nd	3rd			
GP France					2nd									
GP Rostelecom Cup								3rd	4th			9th		
GP Cup of China				5th	4th	2nd	4th							
GP NHK Trophy			8th				3rd	8th		5th	5th	4th		
GP Skate Canada				4th		5th					9th			
GP Skate America			5th						6th					
CS Autumn Classic											1st			
CS Ice Challenge										1st				
CS Lombardia											3rd			
CS Nebelhorn						1st				5th				
CS U.S. Classic									5th			2nd		
Finlandia Trophy							3rd	4th						
International: Junior
World Juniors	2nd	3rd												
JGP Final		1st												
JGP Croatia		1st												
JGP USA		1st												
National
U.S. Champ.	1st J	1st	5th	2nd	3rd	7th	7th	3rd	10th	4th	4th	2nd		
U.S. Collegiate Champ.										1st				
Team events
Olympics												3rd T		
Japan Open		3rd T 5th P							2nd T 5th P			3rd T 4th P	3rd T 6th P	2nd T 6th P
Aurora Games													1st T 1st P	

== Detailed results ==
=== Senior level ===
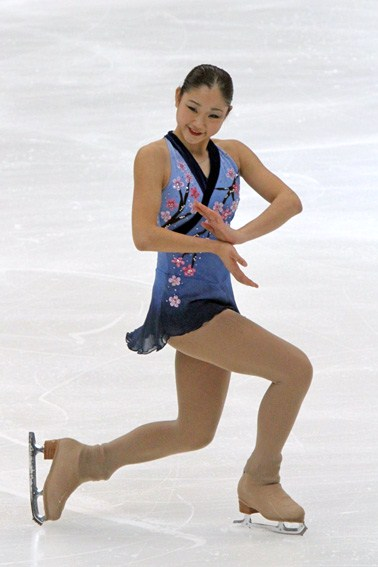
Nagasu at the 2011 Four Continents Championships.

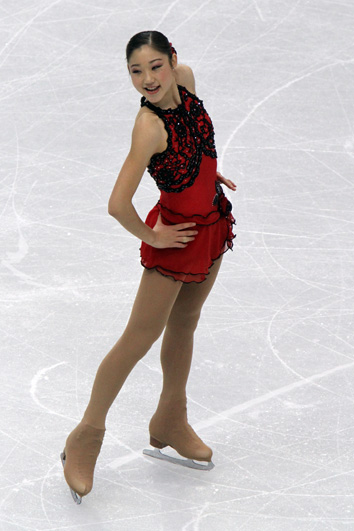
Nagasu at the 2010 Winter Olympics.

Small medals for short and free programs awarded only at ISU Championships. At team events, medals awarded for team results only. Pewter medals for fourth-place finishes awarded only at U.S. national and regional events.

2022–23 season
Date	Event	SP	FS	Total
October 7, 2022	2022 Japan Open	–	6; 100.88	2T/6P
2019–20 season
Date	Event	SP	FS	Total
October 5, 2019	2019 Japan Open	–	6; 111.04	3T/6P
August 24, 2019	Aurora Games	30.0	29.5	1T
2017–18 season
Date	Event	SP	FS	Total
March 21–23, 2018	2018 World Championships	9; 65.21	11; 122.31	10; 187.52
February 15–23, 2018	2018 Winter Olympics	9; 66.93	12; 119.61	10; 186.54
February 9–12, 2018	2018 Winter Olympics (Team event)	–	2; **137.53**	3^{T}
January 3–5, 2018	2018 U.S. Championships	2; 73.09	2; 140.75	2; 213.84
November 10–12, 2017	2017 NHK Trophy	5; 65.17	4; 129.29	4; 194.46
October 20–22, 2017	2017 Rostelecom Cup	9; 56.15	7; 122.10	9; 178.25
October 7, 2017	2017 Japan Open	–	4; 134.69	3T/4P
September 13–17, 2017	2017 U.S. Classic	3; 63.81	2; 119.73	2; 183.54
2016–17 season
Date	Event	SP	FS	Total
February 15–19, 2017	2017 Four Continents Championships	5; 62.91	2; 132.04	3; **194.95**
January 14–22, 2017	2017 U.S. Championships	2; 71.95	4; 122.95	4; 194.90
November 25–27, 2016	2016 NHK Trophy	4; 63.49	8; 116.84	5; 180.33
October 28–30, 2016	2016 Skate Canada	9; 53.19	11; 98.23	9; 151.42
Sept. 29 – Oct. 1, 2016	2016 CS Autumn Classic International	1; **73.40**	2; 115.71	1; 189.11
September 8–11, 2016	2016 CS Lombardia Trophy	2; 61.29	2; 115.57	3; 176.86
2015–16 season
Date	Event	SP	FS	Total
Mar. 28 – Apr. 3, 2016	2016 World Championships	10; 65.74	11; 120.91	10; 186.65
February 16–21, 2016	2016 Four Continents Championships	3; 66.06	2; 127.80	2; 193.86
January 16–24, 2016	2016 U.S. Championships	5; 59.64	4; 129.20	4; 188.84
November 27–29, 2015	2015 NHK Trophy	5; 61.10	6; 114.54	5; 175.64
October 27–31, 2015	2015 Ice Challenge	2; 57.85	1; 111.53	1; 169.38
September 24–25, 2015	2015 Nebelhorn Trophy	11; 48.09	2; 111.58	5; 159.67
2014–15 season
Date	Event	SP	FS	Total
January 18–25, 2015	2015 U.S. Championships	4; 65.28	12; 101.35	10; 166.63
November 13–16, 2014	2014 Rostelecom Cup	4; 58.90	6; 106.98	4; 165.88
October 23–26, 2014	2014 Skate America	10; 49.29	6; 108.92	6; 158.21
October 4, 2014	2014 Japan Open	–	5; 106.85	2T/5P
September 11–14, 2014	2014 CS U.S. Classic	5; 55.46	3; 104.03	5; 159.49
2013–14 season
Date	Event	SP	FS	Total
January 20–26, 2014	2014 Four Continents Championships	9; 55.39	10; 104.39	10; 159.78
January 9–11, 2014	2014 U.S. Championships	3; 65.44	3; 125.30	3; 190.74
November 22–24, 2013	2013 Rostelecom Cup	4; 60.44	3; 114.93	3; 175.37
November 8–10, 2013	2013 NHK Trophy	8; 51.01	8; 90.70	8; 141.71
October 4–6, 2013	2013 Finlandia Trophy	4; 54.01	4; 110.50	4; 164.51
2012–13 season
Date	Event	SP	FS	Total
January 19–27, 2013	2013 U.S. Championships	3; 64.39	11; 109.36	7; 173.75
November 22–25, 2012	2012 NHK Trophy	2; 61.18	3; 115.50	3; 176.68
November 2–4, 2012	2012 Cup of China	3; 59.76	4; 103.70	4; 163.46
October 5–7, 2012	2012 Finlandia Trophy	3; 52.75	3; 110.34	3; 163.09
2011–12 season
Date	Event	SP	FS	Total
January 22–29, 2012	2012 U.S. Championships	5; 59.02	8; 104.97	7; 163.99
November 4–6, 2011	2011 Cup of China	2; 60.96	2; 112.26	2; 173.22
October 28–30, 2011	2011 Skate Canada International	5; 52.73	5; 98.99	5; 151.72
September 20–24, 2011	2011 Nebelhorn Trophy	1; 58.38	1; 109.02	1; 167.46
2010–11 season
Date	Event	SP	FS	Total
February 15–20, 2011	2011 Four Continents Championships	4; 59.78	3; 129.68	3; 189.46
January 22–30, 2011	2011 U.S. Championships	1; 63.35	3; 113.91	3; 177.26
November 26–28, 2010	2010 Trophée Éric Bompard	2; 58.72	1; 109.07	2; 167.79
November 5–7, 2010	2010 Cup of China	1; 58.76	5; 87.47	4; 146.23
2009–10 season
Date	Event	SP	FS	Total
March 22–28, 2010	2010 World Championships	1; 70.40	11; 105.08	7; 175.48
February 14–27, 2010	2010 Winter Olympic Games	6; 63.76	5; 126.39	4; 190.15
January 14–24, 2010	2010 U.S. Championships	1; 70.06	3; 118.72	2; 188.78
November 22–25, 2009	2009 Skate Canada International	3; 56.34	3; 100.49	4; 156.83
Oct. 29 – Nov. 1, 2009	2009 Cup of China	1; 62.20	6; 93.18	5; 155.38
2008–09 season
Date	Event	SP	FS	Total
January 18–25, 2009	2009 U.S. Championships	6; 54.79	5; 105.20	5; 159.99
November 27–30, 2008	2008 NHK Trophy	8; 50.14	9; 74.08	8; 124.22
October 23–26, 2008	2008 Skate America	4; 56.42	7; 86.48	5; 142.90

=== Junior level ===
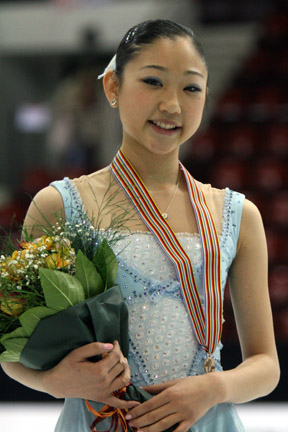
Nagasu at the 2008 World Junior Championships.

Small medals for short and free programs awarded only at ISU Championships. Previous ISU world best highlighted in bold.

2007–08 season
Date	Event	Level	SP	FS	Total
Feb. 25 – Mar. 2, 2008	2008 World Junior Championships	Junior	1; **65.07** (WJR)	3; 97.82	3; 162.89
January 20–27, 2008	2008 U.S. Championships	Senior	1; 70.23	3; 120.18	1; 190.41
December 6–9, 2007	2007–08 Junior Grand Prix Final	Junior	1; 59.35	2; 102.74	1; 162.09
September 26–29, 2007	2007 Junior Grand Prix, Croatia	Junior	1; 52.12	1; 91.40	1; 143.52
Aug. 30 – Sept. 2, 2007	2007 Junior Grand Prix, USA	Junior	1; 55.36	1; 103.78	1; 159.14
2006–07 season
Date	Event	Level	SP	FS	Total
Feb. 26 – Mar. 4, 2007	2007 World Junior Championships	Junior	2; 57.22	2; 106.62	2; 163.84
January 21–28, 2007	2007 U.S. Championships	Junior	1; 54.26	1; 101.20	1; 165.46

== Reality television ==
=== Dancing with the Stars ===
On April 13, 2018, Nagasu was announced as one of the celebrities who would compete on season 26 of Dancing with the Stars. Her professional partner was Alan Bersten. Nagasu and Bersten were eliminated in the third week.

Mirai Nagasu - Dancing with the Stars (season 26)
Week	Dance	Music	Judges' scores (Note: Individual judges' scores are listed in the following order: Carrie Ann Inaba, Len Goodman, Bruno Tonioli.)			Total score	Result
1	Salsa	"No Excuses" — Meghan Trainor	7	7	7	21	Safe
2	Foxtrot	"It's a Small World" — The O'Neill Brothers	9	9	9	37 (Note: Mirai also received a score of 10 from guest judge Rashad Jennings.)	Safe
2	Freestyle (Team 1970s Football)	"Instant Replay" — Dan Hartman	9	9	9	37 (Note: Mirai's team also received a score of 10 from guest judge Rashad Jennings.)	Safe
3	Quickstep	"BO$$" — Fifth Harmony	9	8	9	39 (Note: Mirai also received a score of 9 from guest judge David Ross.)	Eliminated
3	Jive (Dance-off)	"Johnny B. Goode" — Chuck Berry	Loser (Note: Mirai lost this dance-off to Adam Rippon and received no bonus points.)				Eliminated

=== Celebrity Big Brother ===
In 2022, Nagasu was announced as a HouseGuest competing on the third season of U.S. Celebrity Big Brother. The season premiered on February 2, 2022. Nagasu was nominated for eviction during the first week but was able to survive eviction night and remained in the house. She was nominated again and all contestants voted to evict her on February 7.

== Filmography ==
Year	Media	Role	Notes
2018	Dancing with the Stars	Herself (contestant)	Celebrity, season 26, 4th place (three-way tie)
2019	RuPaul's Drag Race	Herself (guest judge)	Episode: "The Draglympics"
2022	Celebrity Big Brother (U.S.)	Herself (contestant)	Celebrity, season 3, 10th place
