= Etta James Rocks the House =

Live album by Etta James
- Released: December 13, 1963
- Recorded: September 27–28, 1963
- Genre: Blues, R&B
- Length: 42:01
- Label: Argo
- Producer: Leonard Chess, Etta James

Etta James chronology
Etta James Top Ten (1963)	Etta James Rocks the House (1963)	Queen of Soul (1964)

Professional ratings
Review scores
Source	Rating
AllMusic	5/5 stars
The Rolling Stone Album Guide	3/5 stars

Etta James Rocks the House is the first live album by the American singer Etta James. It was recorded live on the nights of September 27 and 28, 1963, at the New Era Club in Nashville, Tennessee, and was released on December 13, 1963.

Hot with the releases of At Last! and The Second Time Around, Etta James Rocks the House became the artist's first recorded live album under Argo Records. The concept was to catch James in a raw and fiery performance outside the recording studio. The album is among her finest live recordings.

== Track listing ==
1. "Something's Got a Hold on Me" (Etta James, Leroy Kirkland, Pearl Woods) – 5:02
2. "Baby What You Want Me to Do" (Jimmy Reed) – 4:14
3. "What'd I Say" (Ray Charles) – 3:15
4. "Money (That's What I Want)" (Janie Bradford, Berry Gordy, Jr.) – 3:22
5. "Seven Day Fool" (Billy Davis, Berry Gordy, Jr., Sonny Woods) – 4:20
6. "Sweet Little Angel" (Robert McCollum) – 4:14
7. "Ooh Poo Pah Doo" (Jessie Hill) – 4:04
8. "Woke Up This Morning" (B.B. King) – 3:38
9. "Ain't That Loving You Baby" (Jimmy Reed) – 2:51*
10. "All I Could Do Was Cry" (Billy Davis, Gwen Fuqua, Berry Gordy, Jr.) – 3:21*
11. "I Just Want to Make Love to You" (Willie Dixon) – 3:40*

Tracks 9, 10 and 11 on CD only; not included in the original 1963 LP release.

== Personnel ==
- Etta James – vocals
- David T. Walker – guitar
- Marion Wright – bass
- Freeman Brown – drums
- Richard Waters – drums
- Vonzell Cooper – organ
- Garnell Cooper – tenor saxophone
