= Etta James (1962 album) =

Studio album by Etta James
- Released: May 5, 1962
- Recorded: 1960–62
- Studios: Chess Studios (Chicago, Illinois)
- Genres: Blues; R&B
- Length: 26:01
- Labels: Argo; LP-4013
- Producer: Ralph Bass

Etta James chronology
The Second Time Around (1961)	Etta James (1962)	Etta James Sings for Lovers (1962)

Singles from Etta James
- 1. "If I Can't Have You" Released: 1960; 2. "Spoonful" Released: 1960; 3. "Something's Got a Hold on Me" Released: 1962

Professional ratings
Review scores
Source	Rating
AllMusic	3/5 stars

Etta James is the self-titled third studio album by American blues artist, Etta James. The album was released on Argo Records in 1962 and was produced by Ralph Bass.

== Background ==
The album was released on a 12-inch LP and consisted of ten tracks, with five of them on each side of the vinyl record. The album spawned the single, "Something's Got a Hold on Me" b/w "Waiting for Charlie to Come Home", which was written for James by Burt Bacharach, reached the Top 40 in 1962. The album also included two duets with Harvey Fuqua, "If I Can't Have You" and "Spoonful" which were previously released as singles by James and Fugua on the Chess label.

== Track listing ==
Side one

No.	Title	Writer(s)	Length
1.	"Waiting for Charlie to Come Home"	Bob Hilliard; Burt Bacharach	2:06
2.	"Guess Again"	Aaron Schroeder; Tom Glazer; Wally Gold	2:18
3.	"A Lover's Mourn"	Lloyd Reese	2:33
4.	"You Can Count on Me"	Eddie Singleton	2:36
5.	"If I Can't Have You"	Gwen Fuqua; Etta James	3:01

Side two

No.	Title	Writer(s)	Length
6.	"Something's Got a Hold on Me"	James; Leroy Kirkland; Pearl Woods	2:50
7.	"My Dear"	Reese	2:30
8.	"Nobody But You"	Willie Dixon	2:24
9.	"Let Me Know"	Billy Davis; Berry Gordy	3:08
10.	"Spoonful"	Dixon	2:35
Total length:			26:01

== Personnel ==
- Etta James - lead vocals
- The Riley Hampton Orchestra
- Riley Hampton - arranger, conductor
- Harvey Fuqua - duet vocals on "If I Can't Have You" and "Spoonful"

Technical

- Ron Malo - engineer
- James J. Kriegsmann - photography

== Charts ==
Singles - Billboard (United States)

Year	Single	Chart	Position
1960	"If I Can't Have You"	Pop Singles	52
1960	"If I Can't Have You"	R & B Singles	6
1960	"Spoonful"	Pop Singles	78
1961	"Spoonful"	R & B Singles	12
1962	"Something's Got a Hold On Me"	R & B Singles	4
1962	"Something's Got a Hold On Me"	Pop Singles	37
