= Something's Got a Hold on Me =

1962 single by Etta James

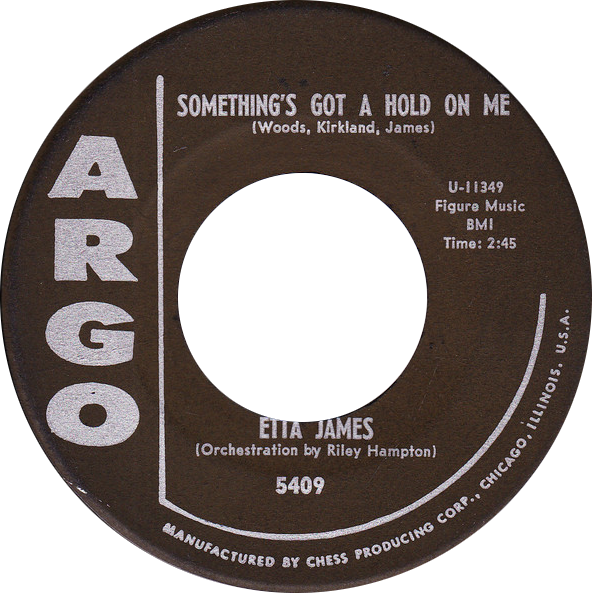
- One of side-A labels of the US single

Single by Etta James

from the album Etta James
- B-side: "Waiting for Charlie to Come Home"
- Released: 1962
- Genre: R&B; gospel
- Length: 2:48
- Label: Argo
- Songwriters: Etta James; Leroy Kirkland; Pearl Woods
- Producers: Leonard Chess; Phil Chess; Ralph Bass

Etta James singles chronology
"Seven Day Fool" (1961)	"Something's Got a Hold on Me" (1962)	"Stop the Wedding" (1962)

Live video
- "Something's Got a Hold on Me" on YouTube

"Something's Got a Hold on Me" is a song by American singer Etta James. The song was written by James, Leroy Kirkland and Pearl Woods, while production was handled by Leonard and Phil Chess and Ralph Bass. It was released in 1962 as the third single from her 1962 self-titled album as a 7" vinyl disc. Musically, "Something's Got a Hold on Me" is an R&B track with elements of soul, blues and gospel. Upon its release, the single was an R&B hit, peaking at number four on the Billboard Hot R&B Sides chart.

"Something's Got a Hold on Me" has been covered and sampled by various contemporary artists. The song was sung by Christina Aguilera in the movie Burlesque (2010) and the song plays in the opening scene of the Best Picture winning film CODA (2021).

== Background and composition ==
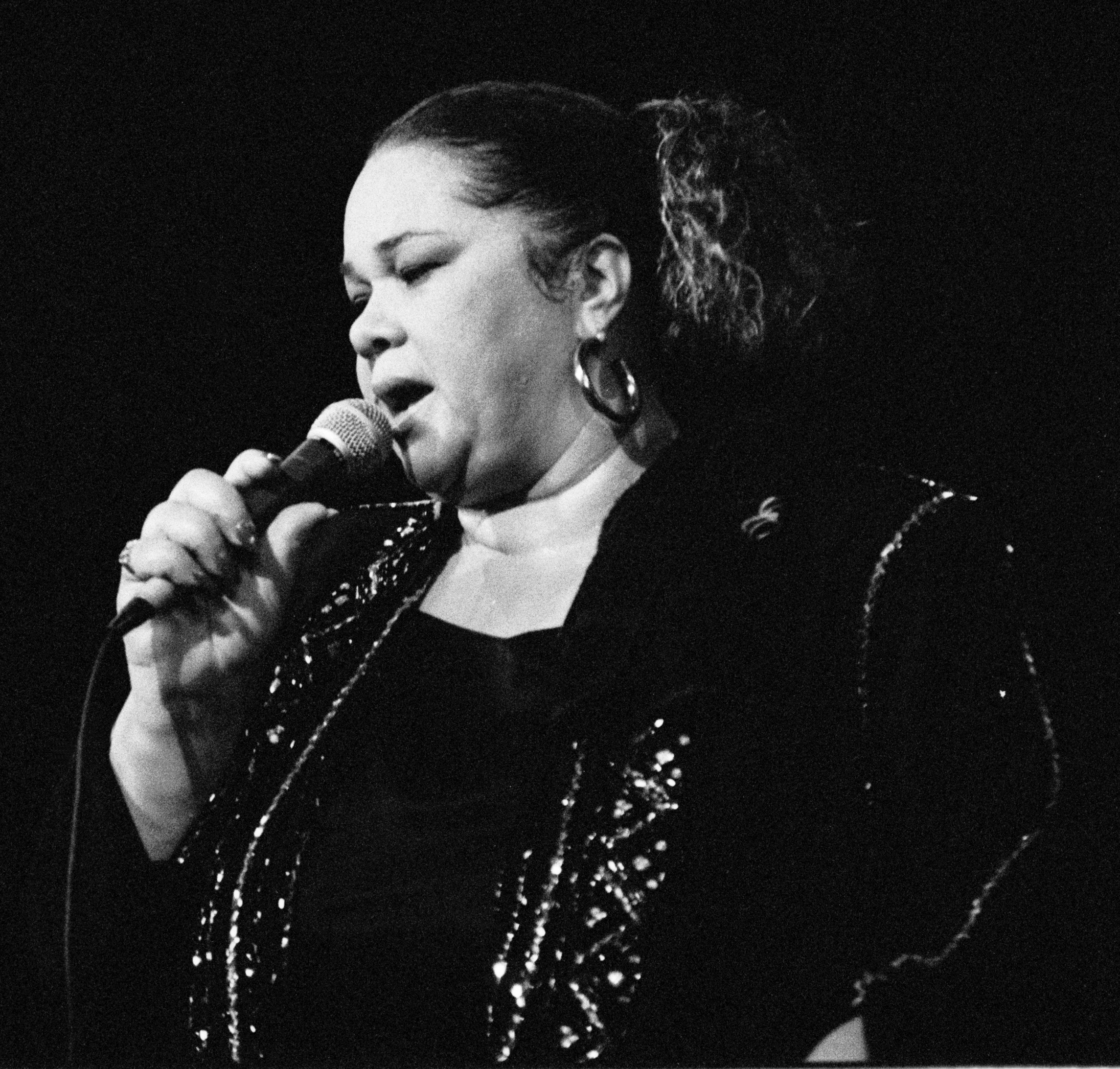
Etta James (pictured in 1990) recorded the song in 1962 and co-wrote it with Leroy Kirkland and Pearl Woods.

"Something's Got a Hold on Me" was written by Etta James, Leroy Kirkland and Pearl Woods, while it was produced by two founders of the Chess Records, Leonard and Phil Chess and Ralph Bass. The song was released as the third single from James' 1962 self-titled studio album. It was served as a 7" vinyl disc with the other song, "Waiting for Charlie to Come Home", as the B-side in the United States. Later, the track was included on the singer's 1963 compilation album Etta James Top Ten. The live version of "Something's Got a Hold on Me" also appeared on Etta James' first live album, Etta James Rocks the House (1964). In 1992, the song was a part of her greatest hits album, My Greatest Songs.

"Something's Got a Hold on Me" is an R&B & gospel track with elements of soul and blues. The song lasts for a duration of 2:48 (two minutes and 48 seconds). According to the sheet music published by EMI Music Publishing, "Something's Got a Hold on Me" was composed in the key of D♭ major. James' vocals in the song span on nearly two octaves, from the low-note of E_{3} to the high-note of D♭_{5}.

== Live performances ==
On September 27, 1963, Etta James first performed "Something's Got a Hold on Me" at the New Era Club in Nashville, Tennessee; later the performance was recorded and was included on her first live album Etta James Rocks the House. During a "King-led all-star concert" which was held at the Ebony Theater, Los Angeles, California in 1987, James performed the song again with American blues musician B.B. King. There, the singer sang the track with backing guitar played by King. That performance was released as a CD and home video entitled "A Night of Blistering Blues".

== Track listing ==
- US 7" single
1. "Something's Got a Hold on Me" – 2:48
2. "Waiting for Charlie to Come Home" – 2:08

== Reception ==
Jay Lustig of New Jersey On-Line called "Something's Got a Hold on Me" a "scintillating" track. Upon its release, "Something's Got a Hold on Me" was an R&B hit, peaking at number four on the Hot R&B Sides chart, a music chart which was published by American music magazine Billboard and now is the Hot R&B/Hip-Hop Songs chart. The single also charted on the Billboard Hot 100 chart, peaking at number 37.

== Charts ==
Charts (1962–1963)	Peak position
US Billboard Hot 100	37
US Hot R&B Sides (Billboard)	4

== Certifications ==
Region	Certification	Certified units/sales
New Zealand (RMNZ)	Gold	15,000^{‡}
United Kingdom (BPI)	Silver	200,000^{‡}
^{‡} Sales+streaming figures based on certification alone.

== Cover versions and samples ==
"Something's Got a Hold on Me" has been covered on numerous occasions. In 1973, it was covered by the choir of the infamous People's Temple cult under Jim Jones. The song also appears on the Belgian band Vaya Con Dios' second studio album, Night Owls, released in 1990. The album achieved great international success, selling around 2 million copies worldwide. On March 30, 2004, Natalie Cole performed "Something's Got a Hold on Me" at the Apollo Theater in New York City. In 2010, American singer-songwriter Christina Aguilera also covered it for the soundtrack album Burlesque. The version by Aguilera met with favorable reviews from critics; a writer from Blogcritics wrote that "[the song] really digs in and makes them show stoppers" and "[it] suits her voice perfectly", while Stephen Thomas Erlewine from Allmusic picked "Something's Got a Hold on Me" as one of the three best songs from the soundtrack. Jools Holland, with Paloma Faith, recorded a version for his 2012 album, The Golden Age of Song. Australian R&B singer Jessica Mauboy recorded a cover version of the track and released it as a single exclusively in Australia in 2013. Blues vocalist Beth Hart and guitarist Joe Bonamassa included the track on their 2011 album of blues and soul covers, Don't Explain. They also released a live version recorded at the Royal Theater Carré in 2013 on their Live in Amsterdam DVD.

Doi-Oing was the first artist to sample "Something's Got a Hold on Me" in his 1991 song "Good Feeling". In 2006, electronic music artist Pretty Lights sampled the song again in his track "Finally Moving" from the album Taking Up Your Precious Time. In 2011, two smash hits sampled "Something's Got a Hold on Me": "Levels" by Swedish DJ Avicii, and "Good Feeling" by American rapper Flo Rida.

=== Jessica Mauboy version ===
"Something's Got a Hold on Me"

Single by Jessica Mauboy
- Released: February 27, 2013
- Genre: Dance-pop; R&B
- Length: 3:26
- Label: Sony
- Songwriters: Etta James; Leroy Kirkland; Pearl Woods

Jessica Mauboy singles chronology
"Gotcha" (2012)	"Something's Got a Hold on Me" (2013)	"To the End of the Earth" (2013)

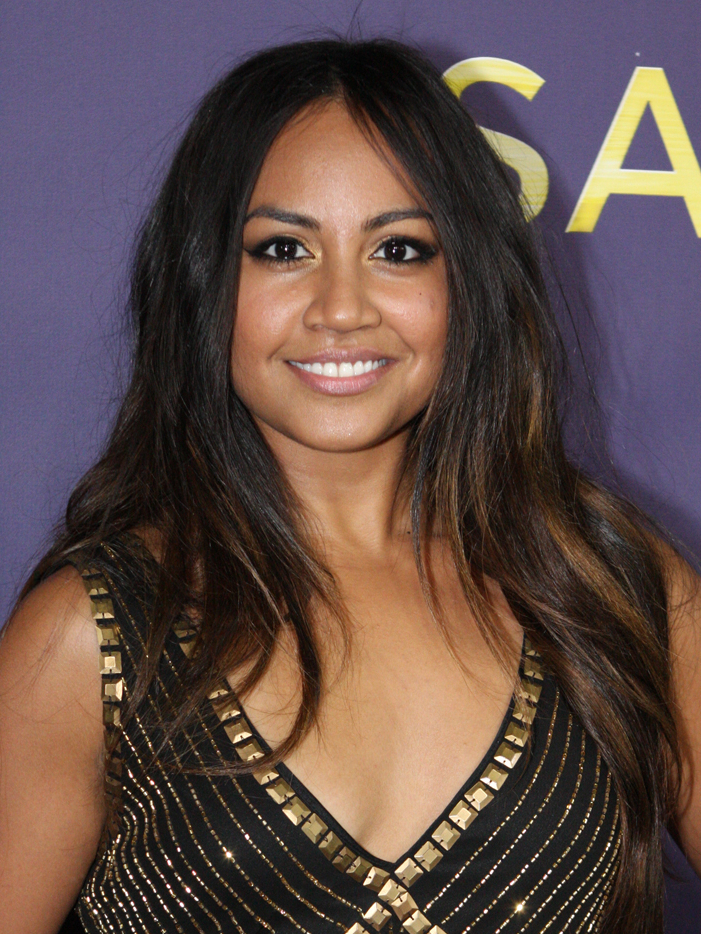
In 2013, Jessica Mauboy covered the song and performed it for the 2013 NRL season.

"Something's Got a Hold on Me" was covered by Australian R&B singer Jessica Mauboy. It was released as a digital download single on 27 February 2013.

==== Reception ====
"Something's Got a Hold on Me" by Jessica Mauboy received mainly positive reviews from music critics. Brad Stern of MTV Buzzworthy Brad Stern called Mauboy's version a "power-pop anthem". Daisy Dumas of The Age was positive toward the track, noted it as a "sassy, pop-heavy spin on the Etta James classic". Simone Ubaldi of Beat magazine described the cover as "grotesque dance pop bastardisation", while a writer for radio station 96.5 Wave FM thought that it sounds impressive. A writer for Take 40 Australia called it energetic, while Fox Sports' Anthony Costa wrote that the song does not feel like "a potential rugby league anthem" but "it suits Mauboy's vocal talents". "Something's Got a Hold on Me" won Single Release of the Year at the 2013 Deadly Awards. The song entered the Australian ARIA Singles Chart at number 26 on March 11, 2013. The following week, it fell down to number 50.

==== Promotion ====
On 27 February 2013, the Australian Rugby League Commission released a television advertisement, which features Mauboy singing her version of "Something's Got a Hold on Me", as well as highlights from previous rugby league matches and fans playing rugby league in backyards, on beaches and running down streets. That same day, Mauboy performed the song during the official launch for the 2013 NRL season, held at The Star Casino in Sydney. NRL director of marketing and commercial operations Paul Kind said her version "is very contemporary" and "has a really broad appeal". Mauboy is the second female artist (the first being Tina Turner) to be featured in a NRL theme song. "Something's Got a Hold on Me" is also the first theme song in major Australian sport to feature an Indigenous Australian artist.

==== Charts ====
Chart (2013)	Peak position
Australian Singles Chart	26
