= Clemens Brummer =

German figure skater

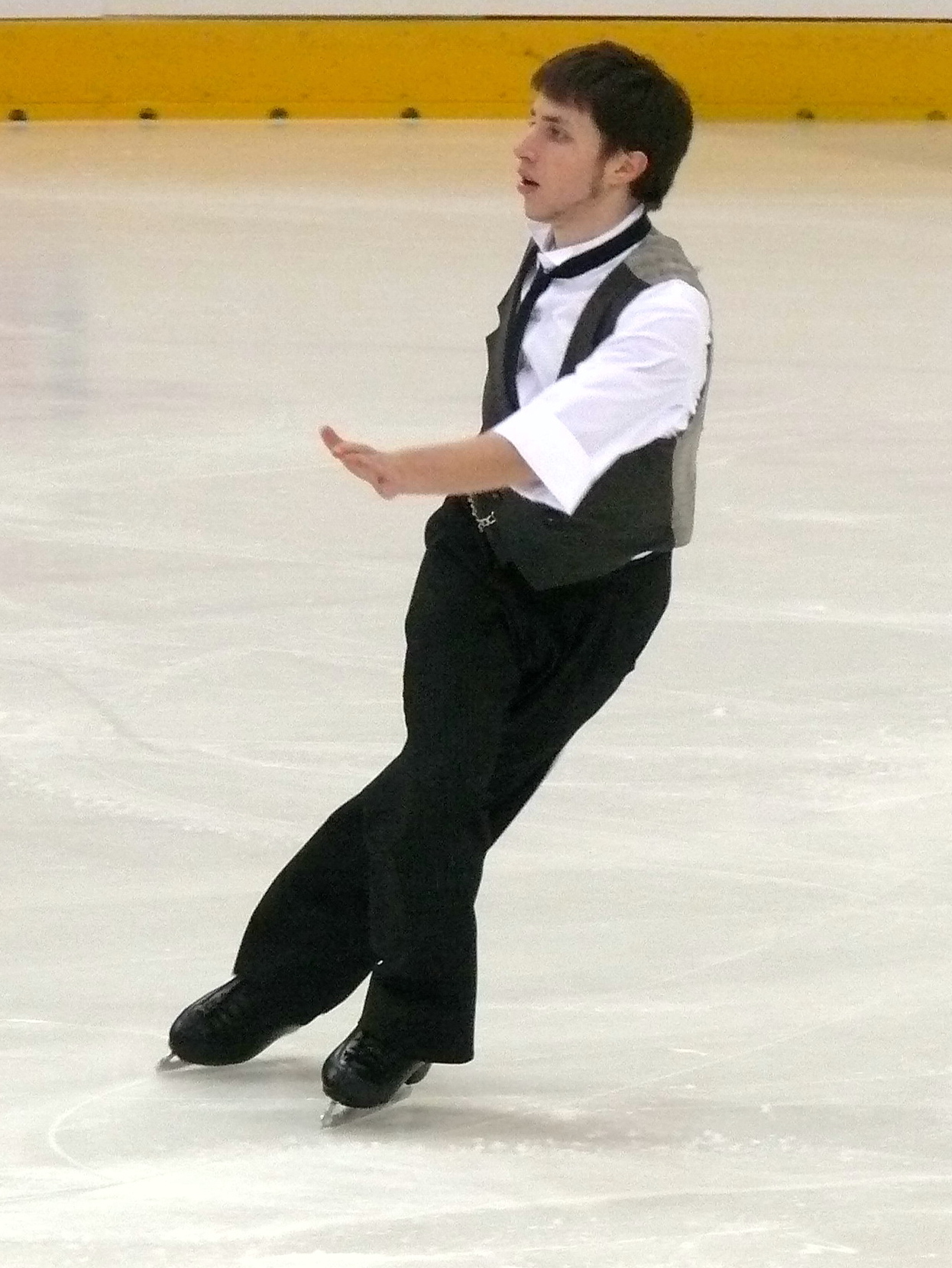
- Brummer in 2008.

Personal information
- Full name: Clemens Brummer
- Born: 19 April 1986 (age 40) Berlin
- Height: 1.72 m (5 ft 8 in)

Figure skating career
- Country: Germany
- Coach: Viola Striegler
- Skating club: SC Charlottenburg

Clemens Brummer (born 19 April 1986) is a German former figure skater. He is the 2008 German national champion and placed 14th at the 2008 European Championships.

== Programs ==
Season	Short program	Free skating
2009–2010	Neverhood Songs by Terry Taylor	Life Goes A Party (from Swing Kids) by James Horner; Harlem Nocturne; Bei mir bist du schon (from Swing Kids) by James Horner
2008–2009	Neverhood Songs by Terry Taylor	Buenos Aires Tango; Tableaux Venitiens; Tokyo by Jacques Loussier
2007–2008	Smile (from Modern Times) by Charlie Chaplin; A Nonsense Song (from Modern Times); The Clergyman and the Drunk (Chaplin Puzzle) by S. Hyldgaard; Green Lantern Rag (from The Chaplin Revue)	Buenos Aires Tango; Tableaux Venitiens; Tokyo by Jacques Loussier
2005–2006	Die Olsenbande; Twin Peaks by Badalamenti; Dick & Doof	Black Rain by Hans Zimmer; Rods and Cones by Blue Man Group
2004–2005	Die Olsenbande; Twin Peaks by Badalamenti; Dick & Doof	Johnny English by Edward Shearmur
2003–2004	Michael Jackson medley	Johnny English by Edward Shearmur
2002–2003	Cirque du Soleil	Michael Jackson medley

== Competitive highlights ==
International
Event	00–01	01–02	02–03	03–04	04–05	05–06	06–07	07–08	08–09	09–10
Europeans								14th	20th	
Challenge Cup								3rd		
Cup of Nice							6th	8th	10th	
Finlandia										13th
Golden Spin								6th	11th	
Ice Challenge										18th
Karl Schäfer				19th			17th			
Mont Blanc										5th
Nebelhorn			14th			20th	6th		18th	
NRW Trophy									13th	
Ondrej Nepela								4th		6th
Universiade							15th		23rd	
International: Junior
Junior Worlds					17th					
JGP Czech Rep.				20th						
JGP France	14th				8th					
JGP Germany			13th							
JGP Poland				17th						
JGP Serbia					9th					
National
German Champ.		13th	8th	10th	4th	4th	4th	1st	2nd	7th
