= Etta James Top Ten =

Compilation album by Etta James
- Released: May 29, 1963
- Genre: Blues, R&B
- Label: Argo
- Producer: Leonard Chess

Etta James chronology
Etta James Sings for Lovers (1962)	Etta James Top Ten (1963)	Etta James Rocks the House (1963)

Singles from Etta James Top Ten
- 1. "Something's Got a Hold on Me" Released: 1962; 2. "Stop the Wedding" Released: 1962; 3. "Would It Make Any Difference to You" Released: 1962; 4. "Pushover" Released: 1963

Professional ratings
Review scores
Source	Rating
AllMusic	4.5/5 stars

Etta James Top Ten is the first compilation album by the American rhythm and blues artist, Etta James. The album was released on Argo Records in 1963 and was produced by Leonard Chess. The album peaked at number 117 on the Billboard 200 in 1963, her first album to make that chart since 1961.

== Background ==
Etta James Top Ten was released in 1963 on the blue and silver Argo label. The album's title was derived from the tracks it contained, her ten top record hits in the previous three years. It included previously released tracks such as "At Last", "All I Could Do Was Cry", "My Dearest Darling", "Trust in Me", "Something's Got a Hold on Me" and "A Sunday Kind of Love". It also included the newer songs "Pushover", "Stop the Wedding" and "Would It Make Any Difference to You" which all became major hits on the Rhythm and Blues Records and Billboard Pop Chart. The album was released on a 12-inch LP, available in stereo.

The album was given four and a half, out of five stars by AllMusic, although no review was provided.

A cover version of "Pushover" is on Wanda Jackson's 2012 album Unfinished Business.

The song "Something's Got a Hold on Me" was used by the Swedish DJ, Avicii, with the hit song "Levels". The rapper and Grammy Award winner Flo Rida had a no.1 hit song with "Good Feeling", which includes a sample of this song, as well as "Levels". Christina Aguilera also covered "Something's Got a Hold on Me" with a little twist added.

== Track listing ==
Side one

1. "Something's Got a Hold on Me" – (Etta James, Leroy Kirkland, Pearl Woods) 2:48
2. "My Dearest Darling" – (Eddie Bocage, Paul Gayten) 2:45
3. "At Last" – (Mack Gordon, Harry Warren) 3:00
4. "Fool That I Am" – (Floyd Hunt) 2:50
5. "A Sunday Kind of Love" – (Barbara Belle, Anita Leonard, Louis Prima, Stan Rhodes) 3:00

Side two

1. "Pushover" – (Billy Davis, Tony Clarke) 2:48
2. "All I Could Do Was Cry" – (Davis) 2:35
3. "Stop the Wedding" – (Freddy Johnson, Kirkland, Woods) 2:40
4. "Trust in Me" – (Milton Ager, Jean Schwartz, Ned Wever) 2:55
5. "Would It Make Any Difference to You" – (Bob Forshee) 2:35

== Chart positions ==
Album

Year	Chart	Position
1963	Billboard Pop Albums	117

Singles

Year	Single	Chart	Position
1962	"Something's Got a Hold on Me"	U.S. R&B Singles	4
1962	"Something's Got a Hold on Me"	U.S. Pop Singles	37
1962	"Stop the Wedding"	U.S. R&B Singles	6
1962	"Stop the Wedding"	U.S. Pop Singles	34
1962	"Would It Make Any Difference to You"	U.S. Pop Singles	64
1963	"Pushover"	U.S. R&B Singles	7
1963	"Pushover"	U.S. Pop Singles	25
