= Don't Cry Baby =

Song composed by James P. Johnson

Single by Etta James

from the album The Second Time Around
- B-side: "Sunday Kind of Love"
- Released: July 1961
- Recorded: 1961
- Genre: Rhythm and blues
- Length: 2:20
- Label: Argo
- Songwriters: James P. Johnson, Saul Bernie, Stella Unger

Etta James singles chronology
"Fool That I Am" (1961)	"Don't Cry Baby" (1961)	"Seven Day Fool" (1961)

"Don't Cry Baby" is a song composed by James P. Johnson, with lyrics by Saul Bernie, and Stella Unger. The song was first recorded on October 11, 1929 by Bessie Smith, who was accompanied on piano by Johnson. The song was revived in 1943 by jazz bandleader Erskine Hawkins, who greatly simplified Johnson's original composition by removing both the introductory (sectional) verse and the "B" section of the chorus. This simplified arrangement formed the basis of most later recordings on the song. Throughout the late 1940s and 1950s, the song was recorded fairly regularly (by artists working in genres including western swing, traditional pop, and rhythm & blues), but was not a hit again until Etta James recorded it in 1961. Between 1962 and 1964, versions were released by James Brown, Aretha Franklin, and Ray Charles. Since the mid-1960s, the song has been occasionally revived.

== Cover versions ==
- In 1943, Erskine Hawkins recorded a version of the song with vocals by Jimmy Mitchell. This version went to number one on the Harlem Hit Parade and number fifteen on the pop chart. With fourteen non consecutive weeks at number one, the Erskine Hawkins version was the most successful song on the Harlem Hit Parade for 1943.
- In 1950, Tony Bennett recorded the song for Columbia Records. Bennett recorded in the song again in 2001 for the album Playin' with My Friends
- In 1961, Etta James, recorded her version which reached number six on the R&B chart and number thirty-nine on the Billboard Hot 100.
- A 1962 recording by Aretha Franklin was included in her The Tender, the Moving, the Swinging Aretha Franklin album.
- In 2004 it was recorded by American jazz singer Madeleine Peyroux, in her Careless Love album.

Others who have recorded the song are:

- Ray Charles
- Bob Wills
- Diahann Carroll
- Queen Latifah
- Gina Sicilia
- James Brown
- Kenny Burrell

== Appearances in popular culture ==
- The Erskine Hawkins recording of "Don't Cry Baby" is on the soundtrack to Spike Lee's 1992 film Malcolm X.

== See also ==
- List of Billboard number-one R&B singles of the 1940s
