= Swing Kids (disambiguation) =

Swing Kids may refer to:

- Swing Kids, an anti-Nazi swing movement in 1930s Germany
- Swing Kids (band), a San Diego hardcore punk band
- Swing Kids (1993 film), a Thomas Carter film about the swing movement in Germany
- Swing Kids (2018 film), a South Korean film
- Swing Kids (soundtrack), the soundtrack to the Thomas Carter film Swing Kids
