= Sweat of Your Brow =

Single by Jully Black featuring Demarco

from the album This Is Me
- Released: June 22, 2005
- Recorded: 2005
- Genre: Reggae, R&B
- Length: 3:20
- Label: Universal Music Canada
- Songwriter(s): Jully Black; Leshaun Owens; Karriem Mack; Erick Morillo; Mark Quashie; Colin "Demarco" Edwards
- Producer(s): Soul Diggaz

Jully Black singles chronology
"Stay the Night" (2005)	"Sweat of Your Brow" (2005)	"5x Love" (2005)

"Sweat of Your Brow" was the second single from Jully Black's debut album This Is Me. Released in 2005, the single featured a rap by Demarco, and was a significant airplay and video hit in Canada.

== Official versions ==
1. "Sweat of Your Brow (Acappella)" - ??
2. "Sweat of Your Brow (Album Version)" - 3:20
3. "Sweat of Your Brow (HodgesAintSweatinIt Remix)" - 7:00
4. "Sweat of Your Brow (Just BE Remix)" - 4:21
5. "Sweat of Your Brow (No Crowd Mix)" - ??
6. "Sweat of Your Brow (Soul Diggaz Remix)" - 4:20
7. "Sweat of Your Brow (Trackheadz Remix)" - 4:59

== Charts ==
Chart (2005)	Peak position
Canada CHR/Pop Top 30 (Radio & Records)	9
Canada Hot AC Top 30 (Radio & Records)	16
