= Revival (Jully Black album) =

Studio album by Jully Black
- Released: October 16, 2007 (Canada)
- Recorded: 2006–2007
- Genre: R&B
- Length: 47:28
- Label: Universal Music Canada/Jully Black Entertainment Inc.
- Producer: Jully Black and Keith Harris

Jully Black chronology
This Is Me (2005)	Revival (2007)	The Black Book (2009)

Singles from Revival
- 1. "Seven Day Fool" Released: August 2007; 2. "DJ Play My Song" Released: October 2007; 3. "Until I Stay" Released: January 2008; 4. "Queen" Released: June 2008

Revival is the second album by Canadian R&B artist Jully Black. The album was released on October 16, 2007 and has proven to be her most successful record to date, producing her first Top 10 hit and winning the Juno Award for "R&B/Soul Recording of the Year" in 2008. In addition, it received a Gold certification by the Canadian Recording Industry Association for sales of over 50,000 copies.

== Critical reception ==
Professional ratings
Review scores
Source	Rating
AllMusic	4/5 stars
NOW	3/5 stars

Matthew Chisling of AllMusic found the album an improvement over This Is Me, praising the production for containing both retro and modern beats, and Black as a performer and songwriter, concluding that "On Revival, we see so many sides of a truly multi-dimensional Black who, thanks to more than a decade of struggle and failure, releases a powerful showing of delicious Rhythm & Blues to her fans and leaves them coming back for more. Black has improved in every aspect, and establishes herself as a truly credible R&B Canadian diva who deserves heaps of praise and success; Canada, you've found your Mary J." Ryan B. Patrick of Exclaim! also gave praise to the production but said that listeners might be put off by it playing safe and yearn for Black's trademark genre-mixing sound, concluding that, "In the grand scheme of things however, its remarkable that a Canadian R&B artist even gets to record a sophomore disc, much less one as ambitious as this. Revival rocks rightly, plays it safe and essentially ensures Black a lengthy and award-winning Canadian career." Jason Richards, writing for NOW, was critical of the album's single "Seven Day Fool" and felt that it carried over on the production sounding mainstream and radio-friendly, concluding that "[T]he canned production is undeservedly insipid and needlessly limits Black's potent and versatile energy. The only highlight is "Wishing", which makes brilliant use of a whistling sample heard in Kill Bill."

== Track listing ==
No.	Title	Writer(s)	Length
1.	"DJ Play My Song"	Jully Black, Keith Harris, Johnny "Natural" Najera	5:22
2.	"Seven Day Fool"	Berry Gordy, Jr., Sonny Woods, Tyran Carlo	3:25
3.	"Queen"	Black, Harris, Timothy Orindgreff, Printz Board	4:32
4.	"Just A Moment"	Black, Bobby Cameron, Harris	3:44
5.	"Catch Me When I Fall"	Black, Andrew J. Thompson, Harris, Sam T. Williams, George Pajon	4:18
6.	"My Baby"	Black, Harris, Clarence Johnson, Ralph Larry Eskridge, Randolph Murph	4:49
7.	"Never Lost My Sight"	Black, Hawksley Workman, Harris, John Southworth	3:50
8.	"Temporary Insanity"	Black, Harris, Harrell Harris Jr.	4:40
9.	"Until I Stay"	Black, Harris, Ian Thornley	3:37
10.	"Wishing"	Bernard Herrmann, Black, Harris	4:17
11.	"Mystery"	Black, Simon Wilcox, Ron Lopata, Harris	4:54

== Samples ==
- "My Baby" contains an interpolation and sample of "Love Jones" by Clarence Johnson, Ralph Larry Eskridge and Randolph Murph performed by Brighter Side of Darkness.
- "Wishing" contains elements from "Twisted Nerve" written and composed by Herrmann.

== Personnel ==
Credits adapted from the liner notes of Revival.

- Dylan "3D" Dresdow: mixing (Paper VU Studios, Los Angeles, CA)
- Brad Blackwood: mastering (Euphonic Masters)
- David "Click" Cox: A&R
- Garnet Armstrong: art direction
- Susan Michalek: design
- Ivan Otis: photography
- Peter Papapetrou: stylist
- Ryan Reed: hair
- Shauna Llewellyn: make-up
- Colin Lewis: booking agent (The Agency Group)
- Sandy Pandya: management (Pandyamonium Artist Management)
