= The Black Book (album) =

Studio album by Jully Black
- Released: November 23, 2009
- Genres: R&B; rock
- Label: Universal Music Canada

Jully Black chronology
Revival (2007)	The Black Book (2009)

Singles from The Black Book
- 1. "Running" Released: October 2009

Professional ratings
Review scores
Source	Rating
Straight.com	4/5 stars
Toronto Star	2.5/4 stars

The Black Book is the third studio album of Canadian singer-songwriter Jully Black. It was released on November 23, 2009 on Universal Music Canada. The first single "Running" peaked at #40 on the Canadian Hot 100.

== Background ==
On the album, Black says, "The stories in my book have earned their way there. I have a passion that I want to share with others and inspire. Listen and take these stories with you. They speak for themselves. It’s simple without being simplistic. It’s 38 minutes and not that complicated. Just take a listen."

== Critical reception ==
Metro News gave this album a generally negative review, citing its generic rock sound, "Her latest won’t achieve that goal [of worldwide success], it’s a misguided attempt at broadening her fan base by tackling run-of-the-mill rock. On the flip side the album had received positive reviews from straight.com "The Toronto R&B singer has a generous spirit, a willingness to be real, to give of herself completely, that infuses each and every song that she sings with gravitas".

== Track listing ==
1. "Running"
2. "Share My World"
3. "The Plan" (featuring Scar) ^{*}
4. "I'll Rock It"
5. "Recalculate"
6. "Love U 4Ever"
7. "She's Out There" (featuring Kardinal Offishall)
8. "Glass Ceiling"
9. "What Is This?"^{+}
10. "Need You"^{+}
11. "Time Of Your Life"
12. "Waiting" (iTunes Bonus Track)
- ^{*} Track written by Jully Black, Gauntlette Alexander Jr., Kellis Parker Jr. and T.W. Smith
- ^{+} Track written by Jully Black and Gauntlette Alexander Jr.

All other tracks written by Jully Black, Gauntlette Alexander Jr., and Kellis Parker Jr.
