= Etta James Sings for Lovers =

Studio album by Etta James
- Released: August 24, 1962
- Recorded: June 27–29, 1962
- Genre: Blues, R&B
- Label: Argo
- Producer: Leonard Chess; Phil Chess

Etta James chronology
Etta James (1962)	Etta James Sings for Lovers (1962)	Etta James Top Ten (1963)

Singles from Etta James Sings for Lovers
- 1. "Fools Rush In" Released: 1962

Professional ratings
Review scores
Source	Rating
Allmusic	3/5 stars

Etta James Sings for Lovers is the fourth studio album by American blues artist, Etta James. The album was released on Argo Records in 1962 and was produced by Phil and Leonard Chess. The arrangements were by Al Poskonka and Riley Hampton.

== Background ==
The album was released on a 12-inch LP and consisted of ten tracks with five of them on each side of the vinyl record. The album spawned only one single, "Fools Rush In," which reached the lower ends of the Billboard Pop Chart in 1962. The single's B-side, "Next Door to the Blues" was a major R&B hit, however, it was not included on the album. The album, however, includes cover versions of Pop and Jazz standards, including "Don't Take Your Love from Me" and "Someone to Watch Over Me." The album was re-issued on compact disc in 2013 and on audiophile 180 g vinyl (with bonus CD included) in 2014. Despite not being given a review, Allmusic gave Etta James Sings for Lovers three out of five stars.

== Track listing ==
Side one

1. "Don't Take Your Love from Me" (Henry Nemo) - 3:34
2. "How Do You Speak to an Angel" (Bob Hilliard, Jule Styne) - 2:36
3. "Fools Rush In" (Johnny Mercer, Rube Bloom) - 2:00
4. "Don't Blame Me" (Jimmy McHugh, Dorothy Fields) - 2:24
5. "Someone to Watch Over Me" (Ira Gershwin, George Gershwin) - 3:37

Side two

1. "Again" (Dorcas Cochran, Lionel Newman) - 3:38
2. "I Want to Be Loved" (Savannah Churchill) - 3:21
3. "It Could Happen to You" (Jimmy Van Heusen, Johnny Burke) - 2:07
4. "These Foolish Things" (Eric Maschwitz, Harry Link, Jack Strachey) - 3:57
5. "Prisoner of Love" (Clarence Gaskill, Leo Robin, Russ Columbo) - 2:13

== Personnel ==
Technical

- Ralph Bass - supervision
- Ron Malo - engineer
- Al Poskonka, Riley Hampton - arrangements
- Don Bronstein - cover

== Charts ==
Singles - Billboard (United States)

Year	Single	Chart	Position
1962	"Fools Rush In"	Pop Singles	87
