= This Is Me (Jully Black album) =

Studio album by Jully Black
- Released: June 21, 2005
- Recorded: 2002–2005
- Genre: R&B
- Length: 55:41
- Label: Universal Music Canada
- Producer: Jully Black, Soul Diggaz, Beat Mizers, Saukrates, Agile, Colin "Demarco" Edwards, Speakerbomb, DJ Nasty & LVM, and Dakari

Jully Black chronology
I Traveled (2003)	This Is Me (2005)	Revival (2007)

Professional ratings
Review scores
Source	Rating
NOW	link
Eye Weekly	link
Edmonton Sun	link
Popjournalism	link

This Is Me is the debut album by Canadian R&B singer Jully Black. Released on June 21st, 2005, the album debuted at number 34 on the Canadian albums chart, becoming her first Top 40 album.

Singles released off the album include, "Stay The Night," "Sweat Of Your Brow", "5x Love/Material Things", and "I Travelled". In the summer of 2005, "Sweat of Your Brow" was a significant airplay hit in Canada.

While the album was heavily promoted, sales were disappointing. According to the president of the Canadian Recording Industry Association, as told to the Canadian Press, online file sharing cut into the album's sales. In the first two weeks, 2.8 million free download requests were made for This Is Me, the largest to date at that time, but just 15,000 records were sold.

== Track listing ==
1. "This Is Me (Intro)" (Jully Black) – 1:53
2. "Hurt U Bad" (Jully Black, L. Owens, K. Mack, George Michael, Andrew Ridgeley, Fareed Johnson) – 4:02
3. "The Things You Do" (Jully Black, K.A. Wailoo, Eddie Holman, Sheila Holman) – 4:14
4. "Sweat of Your Brow" (featuring Demarco) (Jully Black, L. Owens, K. Mack, Erick Morillo, Mark Quashie, Collin "DeMarco" Edwards) – 3:20
5. "Calling You" (Jully Black, L. Owens, K. Mack, Craig "Stereo" Baxter, Yaa'Asantewaa Rashida Lewis) – 3:20
6. "Stay the Night" (Jully Black, L. Owens, K. Mack, Sidney Miller) – 2:50
7. "Free to Love You" (Jully Black, L. Owens, K. Mack, Corte Ellis, Shalom Miller, Matthew Derby, Deniece Williams, Susaye Greene, Henry Redd) – 3:18
8. "Material Things" (featuring Nas) (Jonathan St. Aimee, Lenny Mollings, Johnny Mollings) – 4:26
9. "Double Life" (Jully Black, Collin "DeMarco" Edwards) – 3:53
10. "5x Love" (Jully Black, K.A. Wailoo) – 4:02
11. "Just Life" (Jully Black, Marquis "Da Kidd" Collins, Loren Hill, Richard Jr. Shelton, Kevin Veney) – 3:17
12. "Lovin' You" (Jully Black, L. Owens, K. Mack, Corte Ellis, Maurice Redman) – 3:39
13. "Gotta Let You Know (Scream)" (Jully Black, L. Owens, K. Mack, Edwards) – 3:02
14. "I Travelled" (Jully Black, L. Owens, K. Mack, Jermaine Newsome) – 5:14
15. "This Is Me (Outro)" (Jully Black) – 1:03
- "Hurt U Bad" contains a sample of "Careless Whisper" by George Michael and Andrew Ridgeley.
- "The Things You Do" contains a sample of "I Love You" by Eddie Holman, and Sheila Holman.
- "Sweat of Your Brow" contains a sample of "I Like to Move It" (Morillo, Quashie)
- "Free to Love You" contains a sample of "Free" (Miller, Derby, Williams, Greene, Redd)

== Personnel ==
- Jully Black - vocals, background vocals, vocal arrangement

== Production ==
- Executive producers: Jully Black, Soul Diggaz, La 'Shawn "Bless" Owens, Karnem "K-Mack" Mack
- Engineers: John Nazario, Jully Black, Tyson Kuyeti, Dave Pensado, Traz, David "Gordo" Strickland
- Art direction and design: Garnet Armstrong, Susan Michalek, Linda Philp
- Photography: Jamie Pattyn
