= 2019 Aurora Games =

- Host city: Albany, New York
- Country: USA
- Opening: 20 August 2019
- Closing: 25 August 2019
- Website: Official site

The 2019 Aurora Games was a female international multi-sport event that was held between 20 and 25 August 2019 in Albany, New York, United States of America. Planned to be a biennial event, the Times Union Center served as host venue. Albany was also due to serve as host city for the 2021 and 2023 Aurora Games.

The Aurora Games, designed as a multisport women's version of the Laver Cup, has in addition featured musical performances, food tastings, sports clinics, autograph sessions and the “Conversations with Champions” series of seminars. The keynote speaker for the Aurora Games was Judge Rosemarie Aquilina, who presided over the case of the disgraced USA Gymnastics doctor Larry Nassar.

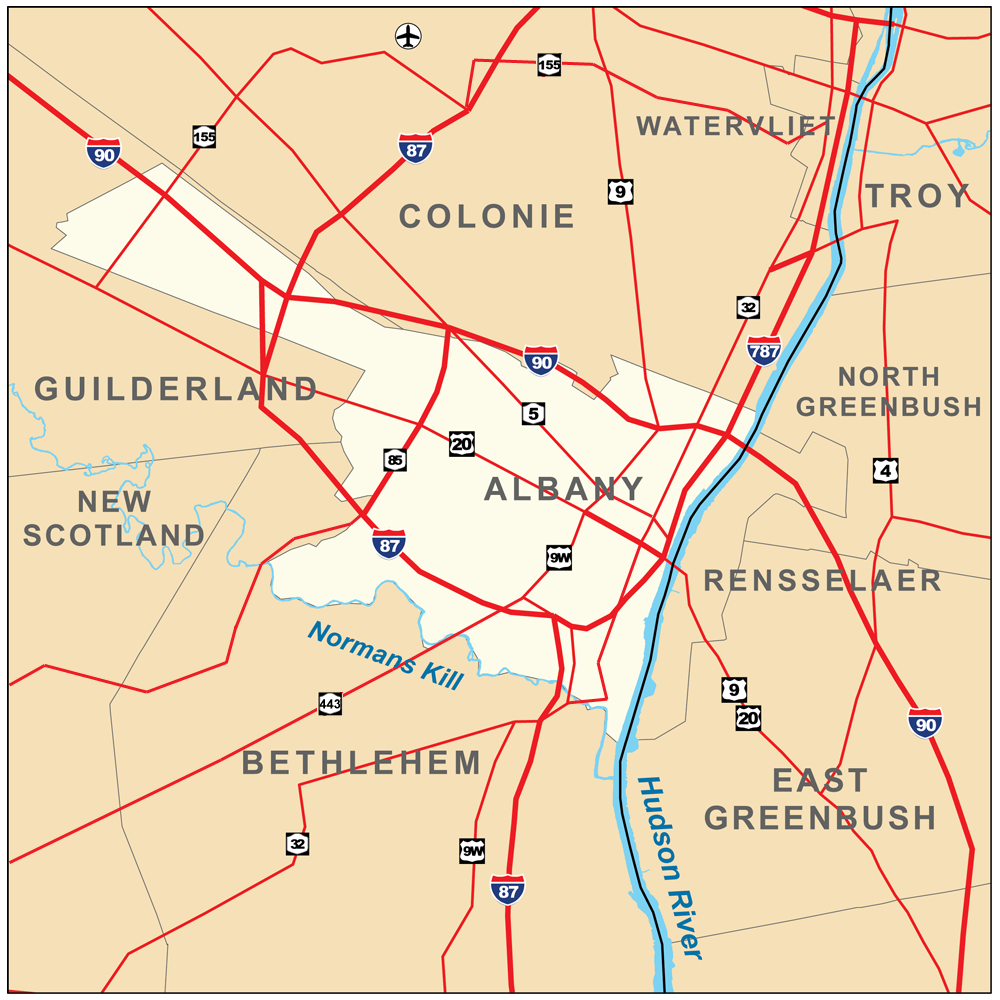

== The Games ==
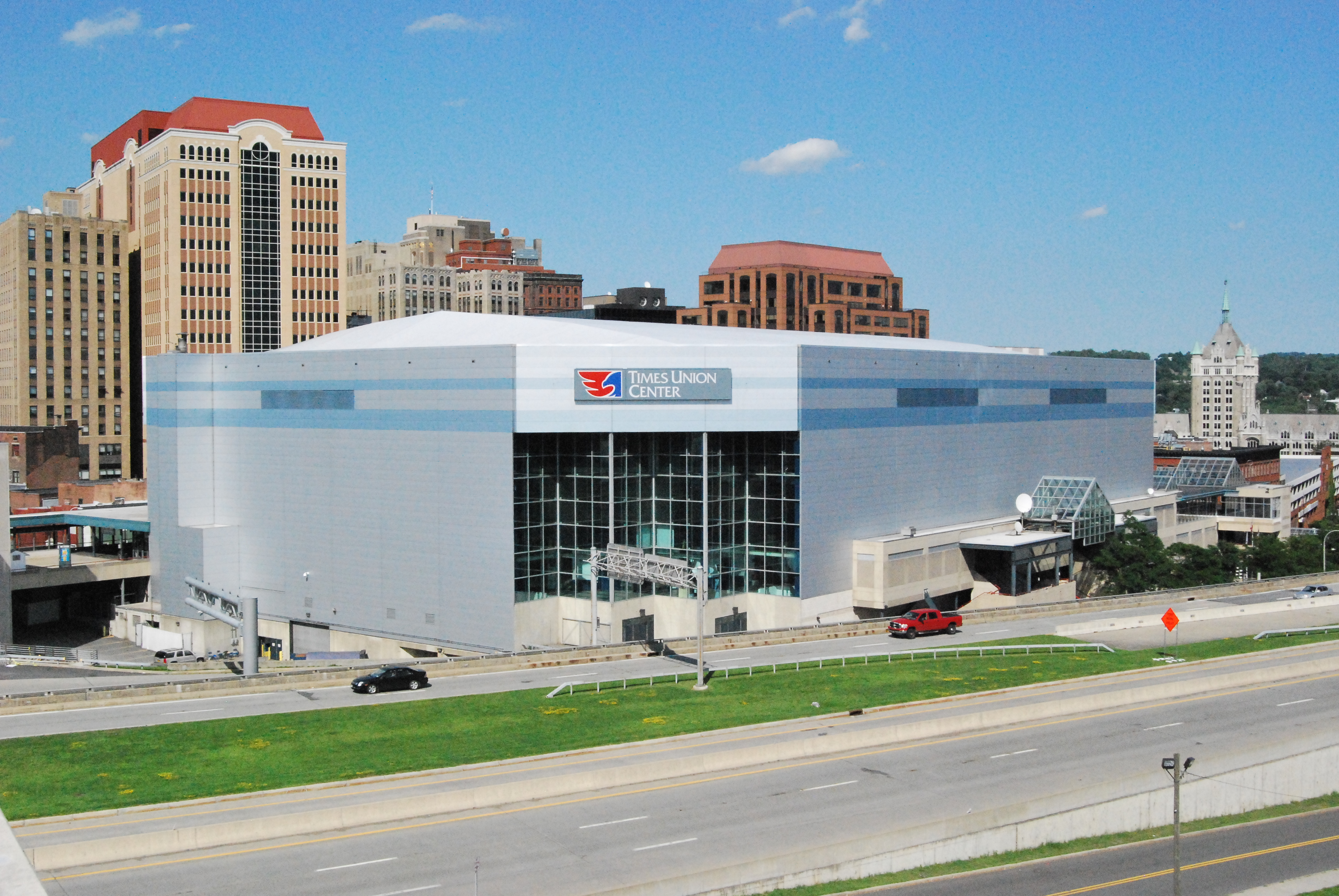
Times Union Center was the host venue for all events of the Aurora Games

=== Sports ===
The 2019 Aurora Games programme featured seven sports. Team and individual competitions consisted of athletes from 15 countries participating as part of All-star teams known as Team Americas and Team World. Said teams were led by honorary captains Jackie Joyner-Kersee and Nadia Comăneci with the teams competing for the Babe Didrikson Zaharias Trophy. Team Americas captured the first Trophy, defeating Team World in six of the seven events.

- Beach volleyball ()
- Basketball ()
- Figure skating ()
- Gymnastics ()
- Ice hockey ()
- Table tennis ()
- Tennis ()

==== Results ====
Event	Winning team	Results	Attendance	Notes
Basketball	Team World	85-77	2,517	15 assists by Laia Palau
Beach Volleyball	Team Americas	3 matches won 1 match lost	3,291	Gold medal game won by April Ross and Alix Klineman
Figure Skating	Team Americas	192.5 (Americas); 182.5 (World)	3,634	Team Americas prevailed in the short program with a score of 79.0; In the long program, Team Americas won with a score of 113.5; Alysa Liu became the first American woman to land a quadruple lutz in competition
Gymnastics	Team Americas	158.5	4,210	Balance Beam, Artistic Floor and Aesthetic Gymnastics won by Team Americas; Power Tumbling won by Team World; Parkour had a tie score of 34
Ice Hockey	Team Americas	3-1	2,851	Team World Goal by Annina Rajahuhta; Team Americas Goals by Hannah Brandt, Kali Flanigan and Taylor Marchin
Table Tennis	Team Americas	5 Matches won 0 matches lost		
Tennis	Team Americas	3 matches won, 2 matches lost	3,920	Bianca Andreescu Canada defeated Victoria Azarenka in a 6-2 final to win the fifth and deciding game

== Rosters ==
Team Americas	Team World
United States (host); Brazil; Canada; Colombia; Puerto Rico	Australia; Belgium; Belarus; China; Czech Republic; Spain; Finland; France; United Kingdom; Germany; Japan; New Zealand; Russia; Serbia; Sweden; Taiwan

=== Team Americas ===
THIS IS AN INCOMPLETE LIST

- Honorary captain: Jackie Joyner-Kersee

Name	Sport	Position	Height	Nationality	Notes
Bianca Andreescu	Tennis	N/A	170 cm (5 ft 7 in)	Canada	2019 US Open champion
Vicki Baugh	Basketball			United States	Competed in the WNBA with the San Antonio Silver Stars
Kenisha Bell	Basketball			United States	Selected by the Minnesota Lynx in the WNBA Draft
Hannah Brandt	Ice hockey	Forward	5 ft 6 in (1.68 m)	United States	Gold medalist in women's ice hockey at 2018 Winter Games
Hope Bravo	Gymnastics	N/A		United States	Specialist in Power Tumbling
Alicia Boren	Gymnastics	N/A		United States	2019 NCAA floor exercise co-champion
Katie Burt	Ice hockey	Goaltender		United States	NCAA all-time wins leader (121); First pick overall of 2017 NWHL Draft
Emma Cannon	Basketball			United States	Plays professionally for the WNBA's Phoenix Mercury
Lauren Dahm	Ice Hockey	Goaltender	168 cm (5 ft 6 in)	United States	Played professionally in CWHL for Boston Blades
Shiann Darkangelo	Ice hockey	Forward		United States	Isobel Cup champion
Molly Engstrom	Ice Hockey	Forward		United States	Silver medalist in women's ice hockey at 2010 Winter Games
Kali Flanagan	Ice hockey	Forward		United States	Gold medalist in women's ice hockey at 2018 Winter Games
Zoe Hickel	Ice hockey	Forward		United States	2019 Clarkson Cup champion
Emily Janiga	Ice hockey	Forward		United States	Plays professionally for the Buffalo Beauts
Haley Skarupa	Ice hockey	Forward		United States	Gold medalist in women's ice hockey at 2018 Winter Games
Brooke Webster	Ice hockey	Forward	165 cm (5 ft 5 in)	Canada	Played professionally in CWHL for Vanke Rays

=== Team World ===
THIS IS AN INCOMPLETE LIST

- Honorary captain: Nadia Comăneci

Name	Sport	Position	Weight	Nationality	Notes
Victoria Azarenka	Tennis	N/A	183 cm (6 ft 0 in)	Belarus	Gold medalist at 2012 Summer Games
Belinda Bencic	Tennis	N/A	175 cm (5 ft 9 in)	Switzerland	Runner-up in mixed doubles at 2015 US Open
Danusia Francis	Gymnastics	N/A	162 cm (5 ft 4 in)	Jamaica	Gold medalist in Balance Beam at 2016 NCAA Women's Gymnastics Championship
Garbiñe Muguruza	Tennis	N/A	182 cm (6 ft 0 in)	Spain	Number 1 ranking in WTA during September 2017
Stanislava Konstantinova	Figure Skating	Ladies	168 cm (5 ft 6 in)	Russia	4th place at 2019 European Figure Skating Championships

== Athlete Advisory Committee ==
The Athlete Advisory Committee is chaired by Donna de Varona.

Name	Title	Nationality	Notes
Tenley Albright	Advisory Board Member	United States	Medalist, 1952 and 1956 Winter Games
Doug Beal	Advisory Board Member	United States	Former CEO, USA Volleyball
Jane Blalock	Advisory Board Member	United States	Former LPGA golfer, Legends Hall of Fame, Founder and CEO of Legends Tour
Nadia Comăneci	Advisory Board Member	Romania	9-time medalist, 1976 and 1980 Summer Games
Bart Conner	Advisory Board Member	United States	2-time medalist, 1984 Summer Games
Chris Evert	Advisory Board Member	United States	18-time Grand Slam Champion
Jackie Joyner-Kersee	Advisory Board Member	United States	6-time medalist, 1984, 1988, 1992 and 1996 Summer Games
Nancy Kerrigan	Chair-Figure Skating	United States	2-time medalist, 1992 and 1994 Winter Games Winter Games
Ilana Kloss	Advisory Board Member	South Africa	CEO, World Team Tennis
Marti Malloy	Advisory Board Member	United States	1-time Medalist, 2012 Summer Games
Shannon Miller	Chair-Gymnastics	United States	7-time Medalist, 1992 and 1996 Summer Games
Digit Murphy	Advisor Board Member	United States	Former NCAA coach: Brown Bears, 2-time champion, 2013 and 2015 Clarkson Cup
Judy Murray	Advisory Board Member	Scotland	Tennis coach, motivational speaker
Monica Seles	Chair-Tennis	Serbia	9-time Grand Slam Champion
Kelli Stack	Chair-Ice Hockey	United States	2-time medalist, 2010 and 2014 Winter Games

== Broadcasting ==
During May 2019, ESPN announced that it was to serve as the exclusive broadcast home for the inaugural Aurora Games.
