= Jully Black =

Canadian singer (born 1977)

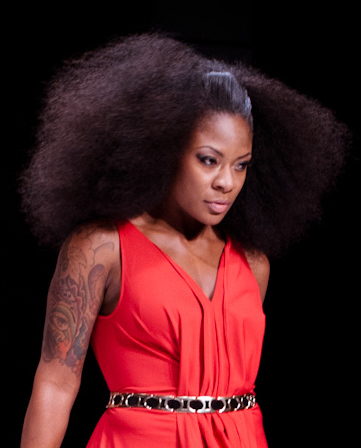
- Black at The Heart Truth celebrity fashion show in February 2012

Background information
- Born: Jullyann Inderia Gordon; November 8, 1977 (age 48); Toronto, Ontario, Canada
- Genre: R&B
- Occupations: Singer; songwriter; actress
- Years active: 1995–present
- Labels: Jully Black Entertainment Inc.; Universal Music Canada
- Website: jullyblack.ca

Jullyann Inderia Gordon Black (born November 8, 1977) is a Canadian singer, songwriter, actress and wellness leader. She has released four studio albums, two mixtapes, two remix EPs and several singles and has collaborated with and written for artists including Nas, Saukrates, Choclair, Kardinal Offishall, Destiny's Child, and Sean Paul.

Black was chosen by CBC Music as one of "The 25 Greatest Canadian Singers Ever" and has been dubbed the "Canada's Queen of R&B" by fans and industry peers.

== Early life ==
Jullyann Inderia Gordon Black was born to Jamaican immigrants. She is the youngest of nine children and grew up in the North York district in the neighbourhood of Jane and Finch in Toronto, Ontario. After her parents divorced, she was raised in a strict Pentecostal household by her single mother.

== Musical career ==
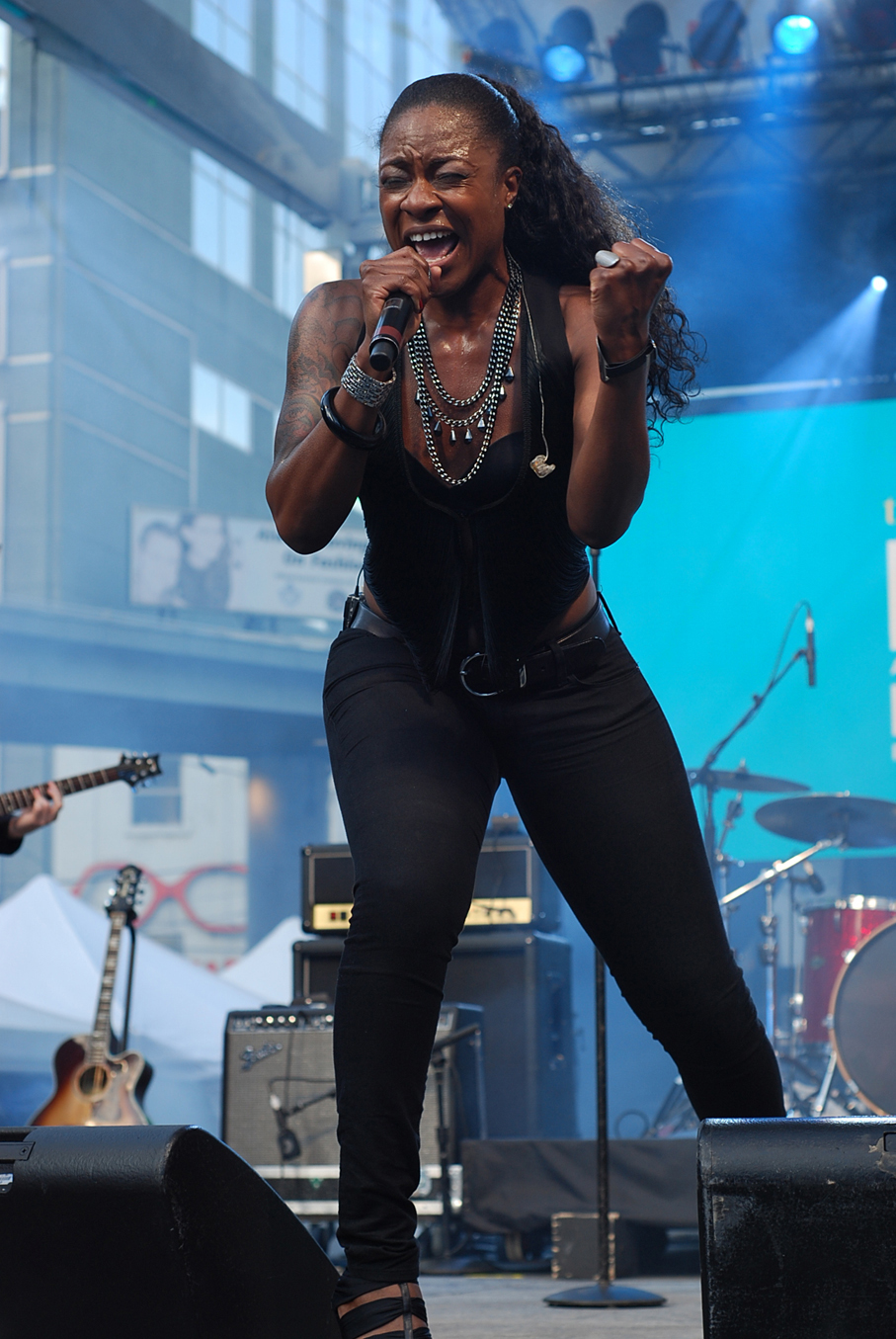
Black performing at Luminato in June 2010 in Toronto, Ontario

At age 19, Black was discovered by Warner/Chappell Music who signed her. Shortly after, she was courted by Universal Music Canada where she was offered a deal. Black received her first Juno Award nomination in 1997 and was nominated almost every year thereafter as well as having opportunities to collaborate with and/or write for Nas, Destiny's Child, Sean Paul and Kardinal Offishall.

Black had a Top 40 hit on the Canadian charts with 1998's "Rally'n". Subsequent singles "You Changed" and "Between Me and U" also charted. In the same year, she was invited to contribute to Rascalz' hip hop single, "Northern Touch", but was unable to participate due to other commitments. In 1999, she appeared on 2Rude's single "Dissin Us", which won the MuchMusic Video Award for Best R&B/Soul Video in 2000.

Black's debut album was originally scheduled for release in 2003 on MCA Records, under the title I Traveled, but was shelved after MCA folded that same year.

In summer 2005, a newly recorded album, This Is Me, was released by Universal Music Canada. The album included singles "Sweat of Your Brow" and "5x Love". Also in the same year, Black played the Preacher in the theatre production of "Da Kink in My Hair" at the Princess of Wales Theatre in Downtown Toronto. This led to the weekly TV series on the Global Television Network, with Black singing the opening theme and being featured in two episodes.

In summer 2007, her single, "Seven Day Fool", was released, becoming Black's first Top 10 hit in Canada. Her second album, Revival, was released on October 16, 2007, and was awarded the Juno for R&B/Soul Recording of the Year.

Black was a correspondent on the sixth season of the CTV reality competition show Canadian Idol and hosted the 2008 Canadian Radio Music Awards. She has also been a celebrity reporter for the CTV daily entertainment news magazine program, etalk.

In 2008, Black lost her manager of four years, Bonnie O'Donnell, who passed away suddenly at age 32. Black stated that the loss of O'Donnell was a low point in her personal and professional life.

In 2009, Black, alongside YoungPete Alexander and Kellis E. Parker, wrote and released her third studio album, The Black Book. Following its release, Black kicked off a country-wide tour in Vancouver at the 2010 Winter Olympics. In 2011, Black and YoungPete created a production team known as "The Officials".

In 2010, a song by Black, "At the Roncies" (about the Roncesvalles Avenue neighbourhood of Toronto), was chosen by listeners to represent the province of Ontario in CBC Radio 2's Great Canadian Song Quest.

Black was selected to perform and open for Celine Dion at the 2012 Jamaica Jazz and Blues Festival honouring Jamaica's 50th Anniversary of Independence in 2012.

In 2012, Black was nominated for a Juno Award for 'Best R&B/Soul Recording' for her song "Set It Off" featuring Kardinal Offishall. In the same year, Black released an EP, Dropping W(8).

In 2020, Black performed on FreeUp! The Emancipation Day Special.

In 2022, Black was announced as a competitor in the eighth season of The Amazing Race Canada and was eliminated on the first leg after she and her partner Kathy missed the entrance to the Rialto theater.

In 2023, she sang the Canadian national anthem at the 2023 NBA All-Star Game. Black changed the lyrics from “our home and native land" to "our home on native land" as a mark of respect to Indigenous groups within Canada. She was later honoured by the Assembly of First Nations for this action. In the same year she participated in an all-star recording of Serena Ryder's single "What I Wouldn't Do", which was released as a charity single to benefit Kids Help Phone's Feel Out Loud campaign for youth mental health.

In 2024 she narrated the television documentary series Paid in Full: The Battle for Black Music.

In 2025, with Jason "Redz" Reynolds as her manager, Jully embarked on a 14 date across Canada headlining tour, her first in 17 years, called "The Jully Black Live Experience"

== Discography ==
=== Albums ===
- 2005: This Is Me
- 2007: Revival
- 2009: The Black Book
- 2022: Three Rocks and a Slingshot

=== Official mixtapes ===
- 2012: Dropping W(8)
- 2026: The LP

=== Singles ===
Year	Single	Chart Positions	Album
Year	Single	CAN	Album
1998	"Rally'n" (with Saukrates)	12	I Travelled
2000	"Say No More"	—	I Travelled
2002	"Between Me and You" (featuring Saukrates)	—	I Travelled
2005	"Stay the Night"	—	I Travelled
2005	"Sweat of Your Brow" (featuring Demarco)	16	This Is Me
2005	"5x Love"/"Material Things" (featuring Nas)	30	This Is Me
2006	"I Travelled"	66	This Is Me
2006	"Gotta Let You Know (Scream)"	—	This Is Me
2007	"Seven Day Fool"	9	Revival
2007	"DJ Play My Song"	—	Revival
2008	"Until I Stay"	33	Revival
2008	"Queen"	—	Revival
2009	"Running"	40	The Black Book
2010	"Need You"	—	The Black Book
2010	"Can U Feel It?"	—	DROPPING W(8)
2010	"Pushin'"	—	DROPPING W(8)
2011	"Set It Off'" (featuring Kardinal Offishall)	—	DROPPING W(8)
2012	"Fugitive"	—	Non-album single
2014	"Here 2 Love U"	—	Non-album single
2015	"Fever"	—	Non-album single
2019	"Follow Your Love (Remix)"	—	Non-album single
2020	"Mi No Fraid"	—	Non-album single

=== Soundtracks ===
- 2010: George Stroumboulopoulos Tonight – Episode 7.24 (performer: "At The Roncies")
- 2008: Saving God (performer: "I Travelled")
- 2007: Da Kink in My Hair (composer: theme music - 5 episodes)
- 2006: Words to Music: The Canadian Songwriters Hall of Fame (TV film) (performer: "Put Your Hand in the Hand")
- 2004: You Got Served (performer: "Heaven")
- 2003: The Fighting Temptations (writer: "I Know")
- 2002: Brown Sugar (performer: "You Changed")

== Awards and nominations ==
- 1997: Juno Award for "Best Rap Recording", "What It Takes" (WINNER)
- 1998: MuchMusic Video Award for "Best Rap Video", "360" (NOMINATION)
- 1999: MuchMusic Video Award for "Best R&B/Soul Video". "Rally'n" (NOMINATION)
- 1999: Juno Award for "Best R&B/Soul Song". "Rally'n" (NOMINATION)
- 2000: MuchMusic Video Award for "Best R&B/Soul Video". "Dissin Us'" (WINNER)
- 2001: Juno Award for "Best Rap recording", "Money Jane" (NOMINATION)
- 2002: MuchMusic Video Award Viewers Choice for Best Canadian Collaboration or Group, "The Day Before" (NOMINATION)
- 2002: MuchMusic Video Award for "Best Rap Video", "Light It Up" (NOMINATION)
- 2003: Juno Award for "Best R&B/Soul Song", "You Changed" (NOMINATION)
- 2004: Gemini Award for Best Performance or Host in a Variety Program or Series for: Tonya Lee Williams: Gospel Jubilee (NOMINATION)
- 2005: Canadian Urban Music Award (CUMA) for Dance/Electronic Recording of the Year, "Sweat of Your Brow" (Tricky Moreira [Just BE Remix]) (WINNER)
- 2006: Juno Award for R&B/Soul Recording of the Year, "This Is Me" (NOMINATION)
- 2006: Gemini Award for Best Performance or Host in a Variety Program or Series for: Words to Music: The Canadian Songwriters Hall of Fame 2006 (NOMINATION)
- 2008: Single of the Year, "Seven Day Fool" (NOMINATION)
- 2008: Juno Award for R&B/Soul Recording of the Year, "Revival" (WINNER)
- 2010: Juno Award for R&B/Soul Recording of the Year "The Black Book" (NOMINATION)
- 2012: Juno Award for R&B/Soul Recording of the Year "Set It Off" f. Kardinal Offishal (NOMINATION)
- 2013: Juno Award for R&B/Soul Recording of the Year "Fugitive" (NOMINATION)
- 2026: Juno Award for Rap Single of the Year, "Who's Driving You" (WINNER)
