= The Second Time Around (album) =

Studio album by Etta James
- Released: December 14, 1961
- Recorded: 1960–1961
- Genre: Blues; rhythm and blues; traditional pop
- Length: 27:14
- Label: Argo; MCA/Chess (re-release)
- Producer: Phil Chess; Leonard Chess

Etta James chronology
At Last! (1960)	The Second Time Around (1961)	Etta James (1962)

Singles from The Second Time Around
- 1. "Fool That I Am" Released: 1961; 2. "Don't Cry Baby" Released: 1961; 3. "Seven Day Fool" Released: 1961

Professional ratings
Review scores
Source	Rating
AllMusic	4/5 stars
The Encyclopedia of Popular Music	4/5 stars
The Rolling Stone Album Guide	4/5 stars

The Second Time Around is the second studio album by the American blues artist Etta James. The album was released in 1961 on Argo Records. It was produced by Phil and Leonard Chess, who also produced her previous album. Riley Hampton was the arranger and orchestra conductor.

== Background ==
The Second Time Around was originally released by Argo Records as a 12-inch LP, containing five tracks on each side of the LP (with ten tracks overall). Like her previous album, At Last!, the producers, Phil and Leonard Chess, added orchestral strings to the background music of James's voice, which garnered Pop crossover appeal. The album spawned three singles: "Don't Cry Baby" (#6), "The Fool That I Am" (#14) and "Seven Day Fool" (#95), which all became major hits on the Hot Rhythm Blues Records and Billboard Pop Chart in 1961. The album includes covers of pop and jazz standards such as, "Dream." The album was re-issued as a compact disc on MCA/Chess in 1999, however unlike her previous album which was also re-issued, The Second Time Around did not include any additional bonus tracks.

The AllMusic reviewer, Richie Unterberger, gave the album a positive review, awarding it four out of five stars.

== Track listing ==
Side one

No.	Title	Writer(s)	Length
1.	"Don't Cry Baby"	Saul Bernie; James P. Johnson; Stella Unger	2:22
2.	"Fool That I Am"	Floyd Hunt	2:54
3.	"One for My Baby (and One More for the Road)"	Harold Arlen; Johnny Mercer	3:26
4.	"In My Diary"	Michael Angelo Graham; Mark Silverman	2:32
5.	"Seven Day Fool"	Billy Davis; Berry Gordy; Sonny Woods	2:58

Side two

No.	Title	Writer(s)	Length
6.	"It's Too Soon to Know"	Deborah Chessler; E. H. Morris	2:44
7.	"Dream"	Mercer	2:22
8.	"I'll Dry My Tears"	Etta James; Clyde Walker	2:34
9.	"Plum Nuts"	Robert Plummer	2:58
10.	"Don't Get Around Much Anymore"	Duke Ellington; Bob Russell	2:24
Total length:			27:14

== Chart positions ==
Singles - Billboard (United States)

Year	Single	Chart	Position
1961	"Dream"	Pop Singles	55
1961	"The Fool That I Am"	R&B Singles	14
1961	"The Fool That I Am"	Pop Singles	50
1961	"Don't Cry Baby"	R&B Singles	6
1961	"Don't Cry Baby"	Pop Singles	39
1961	"Seven Day Fool"	Pop Singles	95
1961	"It's Too Soon to Know"	Pop Singles	54
