= At Last! =

Studio album by Etta James
- Released: November 15, 1960
- Recorded: January – October 1960
- Genre: R&B; blues; pop; jazz
- Length: 29:11
- Label: Argo (original); MCA/Chess (re-release)
- Producer: Phil Chess; Leonard Chess

Etta James chronology
| At Last! (1960) | The Second Time Around (1961) |

Singles from At Last!
- 1. "All I Could Do Was Cry" Released: 1960; 2. "My Dearest Darling" Released: 1960; 3. "At Last" Released: 1960; 4. "Trust in Me" Released: 1961

Professional ratings
Review scores
| Source | Rating |
|---|---|
| AllMusic | 5/5 stars |
| Pitchfork | 9.0/10 |
| Rolling Stone | 5/5 stars |
| Encyclopedia of Popular Music | 5/5 stars |

At Last! is the debut studio album by American blues and soul artist Etta James. Released on Argo Records in November 1960, the album was produced by Phil and Leonard Chess. At Last! rose to no. 12 on the Billboard Top Catalog Albums chart.

At Last! was ranked at #191 on Rolling Stone's 500 Greatest Albums of All Time. It was ranked the 62nd best album of the 1960s by Pitchfork.

== History ==
At Last! was originally issued as a 12-inch LP consisting of ten tracks, five songs on each side of the LP. Phil and Leonard Chess believed that James's voice had crossover pop potential, so with this debut album, they backed her with orchestral arrangements on many of the tracks. At Last! eventually spawned four singles: "All I Could Do Was Cry", "Trust in Me", "At Last", and "My Dearest Darling". The album also included covers of pop and jazz standards, such as "Stormy Weather", "A Sunday Kind of Love", and "I Just Want to Make Love to You". In 1987, the album was released for the first time by MCA/Chess, and then digitally remastered and reissued on compact disc in 1999 with four bonus duet tracks performed with Harvey Fuqua: "My Heart Cries," "Spoonful," "It's a Crying Shame," and "If I Can't Have You."

== Covers ==
The album's title track has been covered by artists such as Stevie Wonder, Beyoncé, Joni Mitchell, Leela James, Cyndi Lauper, Randy Crawford, Celine Dion, Connie Wilson and Christina Aguilera. "All I Could Do Was Cry" was covered by both Beyoncé and Gladys Knight & the Pips.

A Simlish version of the title track was made for the reveal trailer of The Sims 4's eleventh game pack, "My Wedding Stories".

== Critical reception ==
At Last! has been praised by many music critics. Stephen Cook of AllMusic gave the album five out of five stars, and, about James, wrote, "one hears the singer at her peak in a swinging and varied program of blues, R&B, and jazz standards." Cook also praised the material that was recorded for the album, saying that At Last! had "strong material throughout." He went on to say that James's voice, "expertly handles jazz standards like 'Stormy Weather' and 'A Sunday Kind of Love,' as well as Willie Dixon's blues classic 'I Just Want to Make Love to You.' James demonstrates her keen facility on the title track in particular, as she easily moves from powerful blues shouting to more subtle, airy phrasing; her Ruth Brown-inspired, bad-girl growl only adds to the intensity."

The writer for Rolling Stone stated, "James bloomed into a fiery interpreter on this spellbinding LP."

== Commercial response ==
At Last! rose to no. 12 on the Billboard Top Catalog Albums chart. Of the album's singles, "At Last," "All I Could Do Was Cry," "Trust in Me," and "My Dearest Darling" rose to nos. 2, 2, 4 and 5 on the Billboard Hot R&B Songs chart respectively. As a single, "At Last" was certified gold by the RIAA.

== Track listing ==
Side one

| No. | Title | Writer(s) | Length |
|---|---|---|---|
| 1. | "Anything to Say You're Mine" | Sonny Thompson | 2:37 |
| 2. | "My Dearest Darling" | Edwin "Eddie Bo" Bocage; Paul Gayten | 3:05 |
| 3. | "Trust in Me" | Milton Ager; Jean Schwartz; Ned Wever | 3:01 |
| 4. | "A Sunday Kind of Love" | Louis Prima; Barbara Belle; Anita Leonard; Stan Rhodes | 3:18 |
| 5. | "Tough Mary" | Etta James; Joe Josea | 2:27 |

Side two

| No. | Title | Writer(s) | Length |
|---|---|---|---|
| 6. | "I Just Want to Make Love to You" | Willie Dixon | 3:08 |
| 7. | "At Last" | Mack Gordon; Harry Warren | 3:02 |
| 8. | "All I Could Do Was Cry" | Billy Davis; Gwen Fuqua; Berry Gordy | 2:58 |
| 9. | "Stormy Weather" | Harold Arlen; Ted Koehler | 3:10 |
| 10. | "Girl of My Dreams" | Charles "Sunny" Clapp | 2:25 |
| Total length: | | | 29:11 |

Bonus tracks on 1999 CD reissue

| No. | Title | Writer(s) | Length |
|---|---|---|---|
| 11. | "My Heart Cries" (with Harvey Fuqua) | Harvey Fuqua; James | 2:36 |
| 12. | "Spoonful" (with Harvey Fuqua) | Dixon | 2:50 |
| 13. | "It's a Crying Shame" (with Harvey Fuqua) | Fuqua; James | 2:54 |
| 14. | "If I Can't Have You" (with Harvey Fuqua) | Fuqua; James | 2:50 |
| Total length: | | | 40:21 |

== Personnel ==
- Etta James – vocals
- Harvey Fuqua – vocals
- Leonard Chess – producer
- Phil Chess – producer
- Riley Hampton – arranger, conductor
- Don Kamerer – liner notes
- Don Bronstein – cover

== Charts ==
=== Weekly charts ===
| Year | Chart | Position |
|---|---|---|
| 1961 | Top Catalog Albums | 12 |

=== Singles ===
| Year | Single | Chart | Position |
|---|---|---|---|
| 1960 | "All I Could Do Was Cry" | R&B Singles | 2 |
| 1960 | "All I Could Do Was Cry" | Pop Singles | 33 |
| 1960 | "My Dearest Darling" | R&B Singles | 5 |
| 1960 | "My Dearest Darling" | Pop Singles | 34 |
| 1961 | "At Last" | R&B Singles | 2 |
| 1961 | "At Last" | Pop Singles | 47 |
| 1961 | "Trust in Me" | R&B Singles | 4 |
| 1961 | "Trust in Me" | Pop Singles | 30 |

== Certifications ==
Certifications for At Last!
| Region | Certification | Certified units/sales |
|---|---|---|
| Denmark (IFPI Danmark) | Gold | 10,000^{‡} |
^{‡} Sales+streaming figures based on certification alone.
