= Swing Kids (soundtrack) =

Swing Kids: Music From The Original Motion Picture Soundtrack

Soundtrack album by Various Artists
- Released: 1993
- Genre: Swing
- Length: 53 minutes
- Label: Hollywood
- Producer: Robert Kraft

Professional ratings
Review scores
Source	Rating
Allmusic	3/5 stars

Swing Kids: Music From The Original Motion Picture Soundtrack is the soundtrack from the 1993 film Swing Kids. The album combines swing music featured in the film with the film's original score composed by James Horner.

== Track listing ==
1. "Sing, Sing, Sing (With a Swing)" – 5:05
2. "Nothing to Report" – 1:37
3. "Shout and Feel It" – 2:27
4. "It Don't Mean A Thing (If It Ain't Got That Swing)" – 2:51
5. "The Letter" – 4:12
6. "Flat Foot Floogee" – 3:20
7. "Arvid Beaten" – 2:12
8. "Swingtime in the Rockies" – 3:10
9. "Daphne" – 1:52
10. "Training for Utopia" – 3:45
11. "Life Goes to a Party/Jumpin' at the Woodside" – 2:17
12. "Goodnight, My Love" – 3:08
13. "Ashes" – 4:21
14. "Bei Mir Bist Du Schön" – 4:11
15. "The Bismarck" – 3:06
16. "Swing Heil" – 5:28
