= Leroy Kirkland =

Leroy Edward Kirkland (February 10, 1904 or 1906 – April 6, 1988) was an American arranger, bandleader, guitarist and songwriter whose career spanned the eras of big band jazz, R&B, rock and roll and soul.

== Life and career ==
Born in Columbia, South Carolina, in either 1904 or 1906 (sources differ), Kirkland played guitar in southern jazz bands in the 1920s, and after a spell in the army worked as arranger and songwriter for Erskine Hawkins. He joined Tommy and Jimmy Dorsey in the 1940s, and in 1951 began arranging music at Savoy Records in New York. He continued to arrange R&B artists for OKeh Records, Mercury Records and other companies, and worked on rock and roll shows with Alan Freed. Two of his compositions became popular with jazz musicians: "Charleston Alley" (recorded by Lambert, Hendricks & Ross, Charlie Barnet, and others) and "Cloudburst" (recorded by Count Basie, The Pointer Sisters, and others). Kirkland's co-composed number, "Something's Got a Hold on Me" was first recorded by Etta James in 1962.

Although behind the scenes for most of his career, Kirkland contributed to the recordings of musicians such as Etta James, Charlie Parker, Ella Fitzgerald, The Righteous Brothers, The Supremes, Brook Benton and the Five Satins. He worked on 1963's No. 1 hit "Our Day Will Come" by Ruby and the Romantics, whom he managed.

Kirkland died in New York City in 1988.
