= Seven Day Fool =

Single by Etta James

from the album The Second Time Around
- B-side: "It's Too Soon to Know"
- Released: 1961
- Recorded: circa 1960–1961
- Genre: R&B
- Length: 2:58
- Label: Argo Records; Chess Records
- Songwriter(s): Billy Davis
- Producer(s): Leonard Chess; Philip Chess; Keith Harris

Etta James singles chronology
"It's Too Soon to Know" (1961)	"Seven Day Fool" (1961)	"Something's Got a Hold on Me" (1962)

"Seven Day Fool" is an R&B song written by American songwriter Billy Davis, and first recorded by American singer Etta James for Argo Records (a subsidiary of Chess Records) in 1961. The track was released both on a 45 RPM single (Argo #5402), paired with "It's Too Soon to Know", and on her album The Second Time Around (Argo #4011). Although not a big hit upon release, only reaching 95 in the United States, it has since become very well known on the Northern Soul and Mod scenes in the United Kingdom.

== Charts ==
Chart (1961)	Peak position
U.S. Billboard Hot 100	95

== Jully Black version ==
"Seven Day Fool"

Single by Jully Black

from the album Revival
- Released: August 2007
- Recorded: 2007
- Studio: Phase One Studios (Toronto, ON)
- Genre: R&B
- Length: 3:20
- Label: Universal Music Canada; Jully Black Entertainment Inc.
- Songwriter(s): Billy Davis
- Producer(s): Keith Harris

Jully Black singles chronology
"Gotta Let You Know" (2006)	"Seven Day Fool" (2007)	"DJ Play My Song" (2007)

A second recording of "Seven Day Fool" was made in 2007 by Canadian singer-songwriter Jully Black, produced by Black Eyed Peas' drummer & songwriter Keith Harris. It was released in August 2007 as the lead single from Black's second album, Revival. It peaked at number 9 on the Canadian Hot 100, becoming her first top 10 single.

=== Music video ===
In September 2007, the music video for "Seven Day Fool" was released.

=== Charts ===
Chart (2007)	Peak position
Canada (Canadian Hot 100)	9
Canada AC (Billboard)	6
Canada CHR/Top 40 (Billboard)	22
Canada Hot AC (Billboard)	6

Year-end chart performance
Chart (2008)	Position
Canada AC (Billboard)	11
