= Blue Gardenia (album) =

2001 studio album by Etta James

Studio album by Etta James
- Released: August 21, 2001
- Recorded: November 30, 2000 – February 27, 2001
- Genres: Blues; jazz
- Length: 67:15
- Label: Private Music
- Producer: John Snyder

Etta James chronology
Matriarch of the Blues (2000)	Blue Gardenia (2001)	Burnin' Down the House (2002)

Blue Gardenia is the twenty-fifth studio album by Etta James, released through the record label Private Music. It was produced by John Snyder, who had worked with James on five of her previous studio albums. Blue Gardenia contains thirteen jazz standards from the 1930s, 1940s and 1950s. All of the standards were arranged by pianist Cedar Walton, with the exception of "Love Letters", which was arranged by Josh Sklair. Between November 2000 and February 2001, Snyder and Walton assembled musicians to record tracks while James was recovering from a flu; her vocals were added following her recovery. In addition to Walton, artists appearing on the album included Red Holloway on tenor saxophone and Dorothy Hawkins, James' mother, who provided vocals on the title track. Hawkins died in May 2002, less than a year after the album's release.

James promoted the album by touring throughout the United States leading up to and following its release. Critical reception of the album was positive overall. The album reached number one on Billboard's Top Jazz Albums chart.

== Composition ==
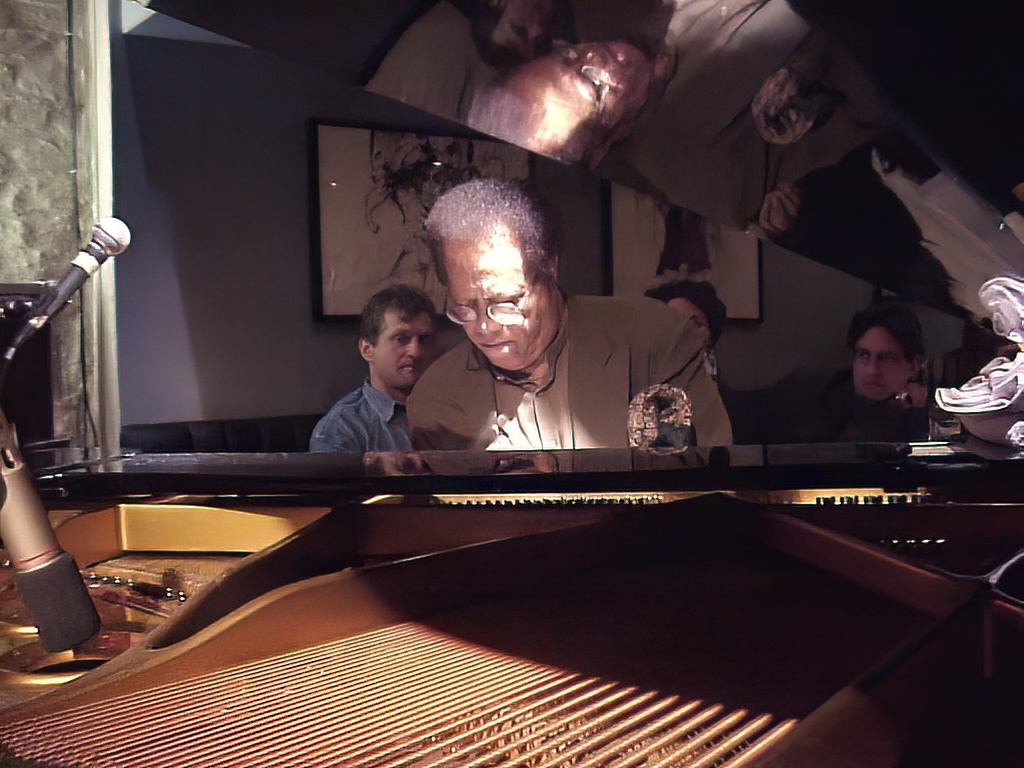
Cedar Walton performing in 2001

Blue Gardenia contains thirteen jazz standards from the 1930s, 1940s and 1950s arranged by pianist Cedar Walton, with the exception of "Love Letters", which was arranged by Josh Sklair. The album was produced by John Snyder, who had produced five of James' past studio albums: The Right Time (1992), Mystery Lady: Songs of Billie Holiday (1994), Time After Time (1995), 12 Songs of Christmas (1998) and Heart of a Woman (1999). Between November 2000 and February 2001, Snyder and Walton assembled a group of jazz musicians to record tracks for the album in the absence of James, who was suffering from the flu. A few months later, James recorded vocals following her recovery. AllMusic's Jonathan Widran described the album as having an "old school big band flavor" with a "bed of simmering brass"; instrumentation included bass, flugelhorn, guitar, piano, percussion, tenor saxophone, trombone and trumpet.

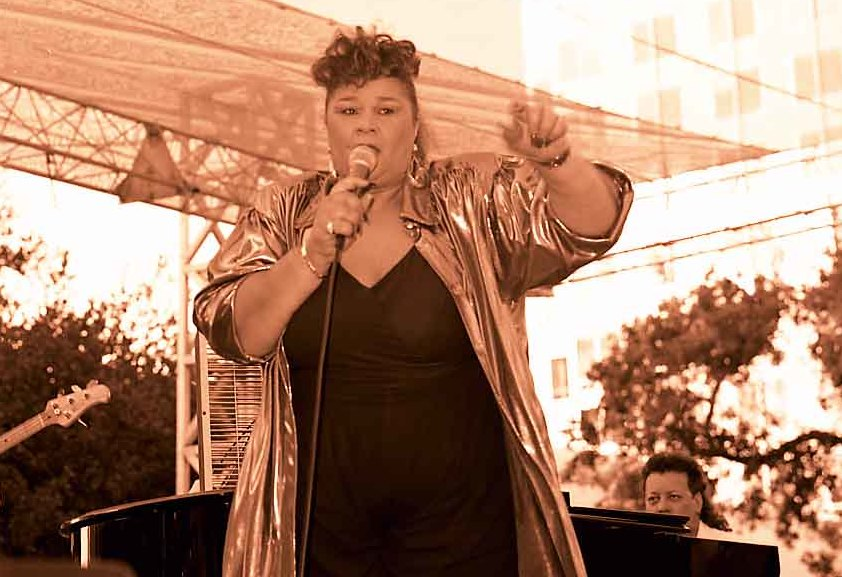
Etta James performing in 2000

The album opens with a rendition of Clyde Otis' "This Bitter Earth", a song popularized by Dinah Washington and later added to Aretha Franklin's repertoire, followed by "He's Funny That Way" (Neil Moret, Richard A. Whiting). Both tracks include improvisations by Walton on piano. According to Dorothy Hill, blues editor for Jazz Now, listeners can hear James "murmuring admiration" for Walton's piano work in the background of "He's Funny That Way". "In My Solitude", originally by Duke Ellington, features a "passionate" interlude by Red Holloway on tenor saxophone. Other standards appearing on the album include "There Is No Greater Love" (Isham Jones, Marty Symes), Joe Greene's "Don't Let the Sun Catch You Crying", and "Love Letters", originally written by Edward Heyman and Victor Young. Sklair arranged the latter song and performed on guitar; also featured is Rick Baptist on flugelhorn. "These Foolish Things", originally written by Harry Link, Holt Marvell and Jack Strachey, previously appeared on James' 1995 album of the same name. Harold Arlen and Johnny Mercer's "Come Rain or Come Shine" is followed by "Don't Worry 'bout Me" (Rube Bloom, Ted Koehler). Leading up to the album's close are Arthur Hamilton's "Cry Me a River", "Don't Blame Me" (Dorothy Fields, Jimmy McHugh), and "My Man" which features a trombone solo by George Bohannon. The album's closing and title track features vocals by James' mother, Dorothy Hawkins.

== Reception ==
Professional ratings
Review scores
Source	Rating
AllMusic	3/5 stars
Robert Christgau	(A−)
Newsweek	3/4 stars
Rolling Stone	3.5/5 stars

Critical reception of Blue Gardenia was positive overall. Jonathan Widran wrote a positive review for the album, complimenting Walton's arrangements and the featured soloists. Widran also said that each track allowed James to "explore both tenderness and guttural emotions" and that James' mother's contributions to the title track provided a "unique touch that [added] emotional dimension to an already emotionally rich affair". Music critic Robert Christgau awarded the album an "A−" rating and wrote that James "[lets] the songs do the talking and [leaves] you to wonder whether her modest melodic variations bespeak sly musicality or weathered pipes." Isaac Guzman of the New York Daily News thought that the album showcased James' ability to "get inside the gentle nuances of classic torch songs and ballads". Dorothy Hill noted the blues sound of the album and the "ache" in James' voice. She complimented the performances by the guest musicians appearing on the album, including Hawkins, whose vocal contribution Hill called "unpolished but alluring".

Billboard's Bill Holland called James and the material on Blue Gardenia a "near-perfect fit" after noting her "hit-or-miss relationship with standards" in the past. Holland felt that Walton's arrangements were designed for a singer with a "less robust style", but considered "Blue Gardenia" and "Cry Me a River" to be "riveting". Lorraine Ali's review for Newsweek called Blue Gardenia a "smooth cocktail", suggesting that James' vocal performance reflected her difficult past. Dave Nathan of All About Jazz concluded that "James may have slowed a bit when it comes to technical skills. But the fervency, the soul and the passion not only are still there, but have grown keener with age. This is an album of more than an hour of from the heart singing by one of the great ones and is recommended."

== Track listing ==
1. "This Bitter Earth" (Clyde Otis) – 4:20
2. "He's Funny That Way" (Neil Moret, Richard A. Whiting) – 6:00
3. "In My Solitude" (Eddie DeLange, Duke Ellington, Irving Mills) – 5:16
4. "There Is No Greater Love" (Isham Jones, Marty Symes) – 5:18
5. "Don't Let the Sun Catch You Crying" (Joe Greene) – 5:18
6. "Love Letters" (Edward Heyman, Victor Young) – 3:59
7. "These Foolish Things" (Harry Link, Holt Marvell, Jack Strachey) – 5:14
8. "Come Rain or Come Shine" (Harold Arlen, Johnny Mercer) – 5:39
9. "Don't Worry 'bout Me" (Rube Bloom, Ted Koehler) – 5:52
10. "Cry Me a River" (Arthur Hamilton) – 5:02
11. "Don't Blame Me" (Dorothy Fields, Jimmy McHugh) – 5:01
12. "My Man" (Channing Pollack, Yvain-Albert, Maurice Yvain) – 5:09
13. "Blue Gardenia" (Lester Lee, Bob Russell) – 5:07

Track listing adapted from AllMusic.

== Personnel ==
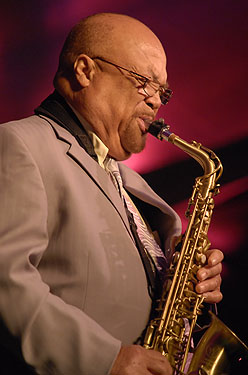
Saxophonist Red Holloway features on "In My Solitude".

Credits adapted from AllMusic.

- Rick Baptist – flugelhorn
- George Bohanon – trombone
- Ronnie Buttacavoli – flugelhorn, trumpet
- Lupe DeLeon – executive producer
- Tony Dumas – bass
- Dorothy Hawkins – vocals
- Red Holloway – tenor saxophone
- Etta James – vocals
- Ralph Penland – drums
- Alan Mason – assistant
- Richard McKernan – assistant
- Sonny Mediana – art direction, photography
- John Nelson – engineer
- Jay Newland – engineer
- Ron Powell – percussion
- Josh Sklair – arranger, guitar
- John Snyder – producer
- Cedar Walton – arranger, piano
- Charlie Watts – engineer

== Charts ==
Blue Gardenia reached number one on the Billboard Top Jazz Albums chart and held the position for at least four weeks. This was James' first number one position on any Billboard album chart; previously, Mystery Lady: Songs of Billie Holiday (1994) and Matriarch of the Blues (2000) had reached number two on the Top Jazz Albums and Top Blues Albums charts, respectively. The June 8, 2002, issue of Billboard, which featured year-to-date rankings as part of the publication's "Jazz Spotlight", included Blue Gardenia at number six on the Top Jazz Albums chart.

Chart (2001)	Peak position
US Top Jazz Albums (Billboard)	1
