= To Miss Someone =

1989 song by Maria McKee

Single by Maria McKee

from the album Maria McKee
- Released: August 1989 (US); October 22, 1990 (UK)
- Length: 3:51 (album version); 3:41 (single edit)
- Label: Geffen
- Songwriter(s): Maria McKee
- Producer(s): Mitchell Froom

Maria McKee singles chronology
"I've Forgotten What It Was in You (That Put the Need in Me)" (1989)	"To Miss Someone" (1989)	"Show Me Heaven" (1990)

Music video
- "To Miss Someone" on YouTube

"To Miss Someone" is a song by American singer Maria McKee, released in 1989 as the second single from her debut studio album Maria McKee. The song, written by McKee and produced by Mitchell Froom, was covered by Northern Irish singer Feargal Sharkey in 1991.

== Background ==
McKee was inspired to write "To Miss Someone" after the split of her band Lone Justice in 1987. She revealed in 1989, "It was pretty much an all-time low. I loved that band. I went to New York having left my boyfriend and my band and, it's true, pain does make you write better songs, but I wouldn't want to go through it for the sake of the song."

== Release ==
"To Miss Someone" was issued as McKee's second single in the US in August 1989. It was issued as a single in the UK and Germany in October 1990.

== Music video ==
The song's music video was directed by Jesse Dylan. It achieved light rotation on VH1.

== Critical reception ==
Upon its release as a single in the US, Billboard picked "To Miss Someone" as "new and noteworthy" and described the "heart warming and comforting easy-paced ballad" as "lyrically astute and expertly produced by Froom". They added, "[The] song should be embraced by adult contemporary programmers, boding well for acceptance at the pop level. Has the potential to be a sleeper." The Gavin Report commented, "McKee gives justice to a feeling we have all felt at one time or another. Her musical and writing approach is eloquently heard on this track. The lady definitely can stand alone."

In a review of Maria McKee, Holly Crenshaw of The Atlanta Journal-Constitution described the song as a "quiet lament" on which McKee "shad[es] her voice with tentativeness" and "explores how a failed relationship can leave one person with a pathetic obsession for the other". Len Righi of The Morning Call noted how McKee "goes from breathy edge of panic to full-throated roar" on the track.

In the UK, David Stubbs of Melody Maker was critical of the song, considering it to be "smalltown FM fare, with Maria bleating demurely about a broken heart only to be interrupted by a church organ solo as if our cup of joy were not full enough already". He added, "An obviously vapid follow-up to 'Show Me Heaven'. Wasn't this girl supposed to be, like, good once?"

== Track listing ==
CD promotional single (US)

1. "To Miss Someone" (Edit) – 3:45
2. "To Miss Someone" (LP Version) – 3:51

7-inch single (UK and Germany)

1. "To Miss Someone" (Edit) – 3:43
2. "Nobody's Child" – 3:56

7-inch single (Australia)

1. "To Miss Someone" – 3:51
2. "Drinkin' in My Sunday Dress" – 3:29

12-inch single (UK)

1. "To Miss Someone" (Edit) – 3:43
2. "Nobody's Child" – 3:56
3. "Breathe" – 4:32

CD single (UK and Germany)

1. "To Miss Someone" (Edit) – 3:43
2. "Nobody's Child" – 3:56
3. "Breathe" – 4:32

== Personnel ==
Production

- Mitchell Froom – producer
- Bruce Brody – associate producer
- Tchad Blake – engineer
- Gary Gersh – executive producer

== Charts ==
Chart (1990)	Peak position
UK Playlist Chart (Music Week)	54

== Feargal Sharkey version ==
"To Miss Someone"

Single by Feargal Sharkey

from the album Songs from the Mardi Gras
- Released: 1991
- Length: 3:41
- Label: Virgin
- Songwriter(s): Maria McKee
- Producer(s): Barry Beckett

Feargal Sharkey singles chronology
"Women & I" (1991)	"To Miss Someone" (1991)	"Cry Like a Rainy Day" (1991)

Northern Irish singer Feargal Sharkey covered "To Miss Someone" on his third and final studio album Songs from the Mardi Gras (1991). Produced by Barry Beckett, it was released as the third single from the album and reached number 102 in the UK Singles Chart. Sharkey had previously recorded the McKee-penned "A Good Heart" which reached the UK number one spot in 1985.

=== Critical reception ===
Upon its release as a single, Barbara Ellen of New Musical Express praised Sharkey for having "the most heavenly wheeze in pop", but felt that "here he sadly does not improve on McKee's majestic original". Martin Price and Graham Massey of 808 State, as guest reviewers, were also critical. Price felt that on the song "he's trying to sound too sophisticated" and prefers him when he "sounds dead raw". Massey believed the song "just sounds like FM radio averageness" and added that Sharkey is "better when he writes his own stuff". Everett True of Melody Maker wrote, "He's fucked now, isn't he? Fancy having a voice like that and treating it to a song like this. Take that any way you like." In a review of Songs from the Mardi Gras, Paul Sexton of Select described "To Miss Someone" as a "pretty obvious attempt to re-create the conditions of 'A Good Heart'".

=== Track listing ===
7-inch and cassette single (UK)

1. "To Miss Someone" – 3:41
2. "I'll Take It Back" (Live) – 3:57

CD single (UK)

1. "To Miss Someone" – 3:41
2. "I'll Take It Back" (Live) – 3:57
3. "Never Never" (The Assembly) – 3:46
4. "Miss You Fever" (Instrumental) – 4:11

=== Personnel ===
Production

- Barry Beckett – producer on "To Miss Someone" and "Miss You Fever"
- Justin Niebank – mixing on "To Miss Someone" and "Miss You Fever"
- Feargal Sharkey – producer on "I'll Take It Back"
- Andy Mason – mixing on "I'll Take It Back"
- The Assembly – producers on "Never Never"

Other

- Idest – sleeve design
- Peter Smith – photography

=== Charts ===
Chart (1991)	Peak position
UK Singles Chart (OCC)	102
UK Playlist Chart (Music Week)	52
