= Matriarch of the Blues =

2000 studio album by Etta James

Studio album by Etta James
- Released: December 12, 2000
- Genres: Blues; rhythm and blues
- Length: 64:19
- Label: Private Music
- Producers: Donto Metto James; Sametto James; Lupe DeLeon (executive)

Etta James chronology
Heart of a Woman (1999)	Matriarch of the Blues (2000)	Blue Gardenia (2001)

Matriarch of the Blues is the twenty-fourth studio album by Etta James, released in December 2000 through the record label Private Music. The album's title reflects James' nickname as "matriarch of the blues". Marking James' return to blues following attempts at country music and jazz and pop standards, the album consists primarily of rhythm and blues covers. James' sons, Donto and Sametto, are credited as engineers, mixers, and producers, among other contributions; the album features Mike Finnigan on the Hammond organ, guitarist Leo Nocentelli, and performances on multiple instruments by Jimmy Zavala.

Matriarch of the Blues received mixed critical reception. Following its release, the album reached a peak position of number two on Billboard's Top Blues Albums chart. Billboard's final issue for 2001 included Matriarch as number ten on its list of Top Blues Albums for the year. The album was nominated for Best Contemporary Blues Album at the 44th Grammy Awards.

== Background and composition ==
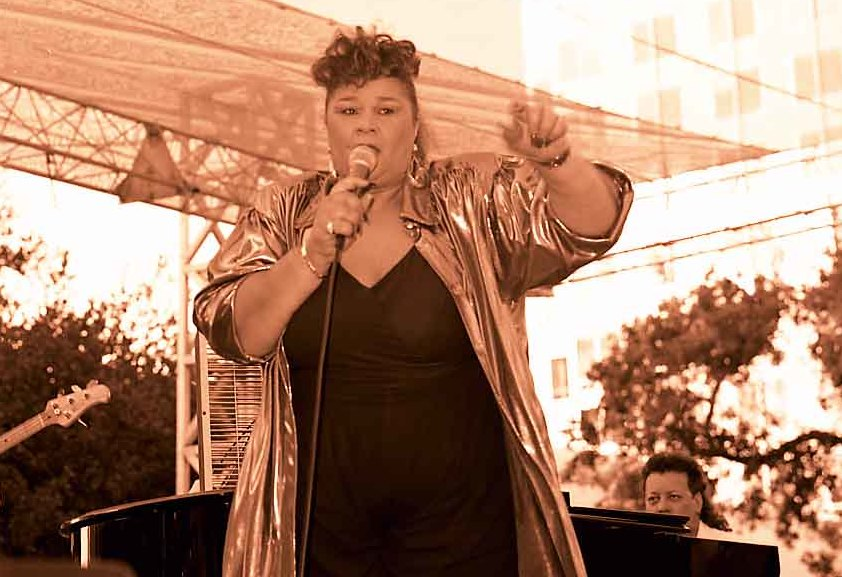
Etta James performing in 2000

Entertainment Weekly considered Matriarch of the Blues reflected James' desire to reclaim her title of the "mother of the blues" following earlier attempts at country music and jazz and pop standards. Rolling Stone grouped Matriarch in a "trifecta" with James' previous two studio albums, Life, Love & the Blues (1998) and Heart of a Woman (1999). Prior to the album's release, James performed at the eighteenth annual San Francisco Jazz Festival at the Masonic Auditorium.

Matriarch is composed of rock, soul and blues standards between five and seven minutes in length. People magazine contributors described James' vocals as "deeply funky". Mike Finnigan performed the Hammond B3 organ, Leo Nocentelli featured on guitar, and Jimmy Zavala contributed performances on multiple instruments. James' two sons — Donto and Sametto — produced and engineered, and played drums and bass, respectively.

The album begins with the sound of a motorcycle engine. Bob Dylan's "Gotta Serve Somebody" is delivered, according to Parke Puterbaugh of Rolling Stone, with "the air of Old Testament-style authority it demands". James does not modify the lyrics, singing "You can call me Bobby, you can call me Zimmy". "Don't Let My Baby Ride", originally by Deadric Malone and O. V. Wright, adds a bit of sensuality to the album with the line: "If his jeans are too tight... you might see what you like". Other covers include Al Green's "Rhymes", "Try a Little Tenderness" (Jimmy Campbell and Reg Connelly, Harry M. Woods), and Otis Redding's "Hawg for Ya". The tempo of The Rolling Stones' "Miss You" is slowed down to a "sensual simmer". James modified the gender mentioned in the lyrics, singing "Puerto Rican boys just dying to meet you". Following "Hawg" are Malone's "You're Gonna Make Me Cry", which features vocals by Finnigan, Sandy Jones' "Walking the Back Streets", and Benny Latimore's "Let's Straighten It Out". Closing the album are John Fogerty's "Born on the Bayou", "Come Back Baby" (Ray Charles, Lightnin' Hopkins), and Jerry Leiber and Mike Stoller's "Hound Dog".

== Reception ==
Professional ratings
Aggregate scores
Source	Rating
Metacritic	69/100
Review scores
Source	Rating
AllMusic	3/5 stars
Associated Press	(positive)
The Penguin Guide to Blues Recordings	3/4 stars
Entertainment Weekly	B
MSN Music (Expert Witness)	B+
Rolling Stone	3.5/5 stars

Matriarch of the Blues received mixed critical reception. AllMusic's Matthew Robinson wrote that James "coast[ed]" through the album and the backing band lacked "youthful vitality". Robinson thought the album's opening track "Gotta Serve Somebody" came across more as a "sleepy suggestion". However, he felt the "draggier pace and intermittent woofs" in "Miss You" added sex appeal and complimented the "funkification" of "Born on the Bayou" and "Hound Dog". Associated Press contributor Gene Bright wrote a positive review of the album but was disappointed with James' cover of "Miss You", writing "the song just can't be slowed and manipulated with any success". People magazine contributors felt that the motorcycle sound in the introduction was unnecessary and considered the album to be more "full-throated gospel-rock" than blues. However, they wrote that James sounded "as sexy and full of sass as she did nearly half a century ago". With James' sons contributing to the album, Bill Milkowski of JazzTimes called the album a "real family affair" and "worthy follow-up" to Heart of a Woman. In his review for Out, Barry Walters complimented Donto and Sametto's rhythm performances. Walters noted that James lacked all of the vocal notes available to her in the 1960s but wrote that her "interpretive abilities are sharper than ever".

The Morning Call's Larry Printz published a negative review, concluding that James' performance was mediocre and that the "nuances in [her] once-formidable voice are long gone". Printz also criticized the slow tempo throughout the album and accused James of "coasting" on her legendary status. James Sullivan of Entertainment Weekly wrote that James' "voice isn't quite the nasty snarl it once was, but the attitude remains". Sullivan thought "Hound Dog" was the album's best composition. Rolling Stone's Marie Elsie St. Léger wrote that James provided a "healthy dose of rootsy feminism and mettle" with her "passionately seasoned and gravel-edged voice". St. Léger also complimented James and her performance for having "inimitable depth" and for "making no apologies and needing no permission to sing it like she feels it". Parke Puterbaugh of Rolling Stone named "Don't Let My Baby Ride", "Hawg for Ya" and "Come Back Baby" as the album's greatest tracks. In his review, Puterbaugh concluded that the album is a "solid return to roots", allowing James the right to reclaim her titular throne.

== Chart performance and recognition ==
The album reached a peak position of number two on Billboard's Top Blues Albums chart. The album entered the chart at number seven the week of December 20, 2000. Matriarch climbed to number four by the week of January 27, 2001. By its fifteenth week on the chart the album had fallen to number seven, and by its twenty-fifth week on the chart (week of June 16, 2001) the album remained at number thirteen. Billboard's final issue for 2001 included Matriarch of the Blues as number ten on its list of Top Blues Albums for the year. James and the album were nominated for Best Contemporary Blues Album at the 44th Grammy Awards, but lost to Delbert McClinton for the album Nothing Personal.

Chart (2000)	Peak position
Billboard's Top Blues Albums	2

== Track listing ==
1. "Gotta Serve Somebody" (Bob Dylan) – 6:48
2. "Don't Let My Baby Ride" (Deadric Malone, O. V. Wright) – 5:16
3. "Rhymes" (Al Green, Teenie Hodges) – 4:35
4. "Try a Little Tenderness" (Jimmy Campbell, Reg Connelly, Harry M. Woods) – 4:47
5. "Miss You" (Mick Jagger, Keith Richards) – 5:59
6. "Hawg for Ya" (Otis Redding) – 3:45
7. "You're Gonna Make Me Cry" (Deadric Malone) – 6:17
8. "Walking the Back Streets" (Sandy Jones, Jr.) – 7:07
9. "Let's Straighten It Out" (Curtis, Latimore, Scotomayer) – 5:24
10. "Born on the Bayou" (John Fogerty) – 4:41
11. "Come Back Baby" (Ray Charles, Lightnin' Hopkins) – 5:57
12. "Hound Dog" (Jerry Leiber, Mike Stoller) – 3:43

Track listing adapted from Allmusic.

== Personnel ==
- Julie Bruzzone – creative director
- Rudy Calvo – make-up
- Lupe DeLeon – executive producer
- Mike Finnigan – Hammond organ
- Terrance Galloway – assistant engineer
- Donto Metto James – drums, engineer, mixing, percussion, producer
- Etta James – backing vocals, liner notes, vocals
- Sametto James – bass, engineer, mixing, producer
- Sonny Mediana – design, photography
- Bobby Murray – guitar, solo instrumental
- Leo Nocentelli – guitar, solo instrumental
- Tom Poole – trumpet
- Doug Sax – mastering
- Josh Sklair – acoustic guitar, electric guitar, keyboards, rhythm arrangements, slide guitar
- Jimmy Zavala – harmonica, baritone saxophone, tenor saxophone

Credits adapted from Allmusic.
