= I've Got News for You (Feargal Sharkey song) =

Single by Feargal Sharkey

from the album Songs from the Mardi Gras
- B-side: "I Can't Begin to Stop"
- Released: 25 February 1991
- Genre: Pop
- Length: 4:52
- Label: Virgin
- Songwriters: Feargal Sharkey, Dennis Morgan
- Producer: Barry Beckett

Feargal Sharkey singles chronology
"If This is Love" (1988)	"I've Got News for You" (1991)	"Women & I" (1991)

"I've Got News for You" is a song by Irish singer Feargal Sharkey, released on 25 February 1991 by Virgin Records as the first single from his third studio album, Songs from the Mardi Gras (1991). It was written by Sharkey and Dennis Morgan, and produced by Barry Beckett. The song reached No. 12 in the UK and No. 8 in Ireland.

A music video was filmed to promote the single, while Sharkey also performed the song on the UK TV music show Top of The Pops. The B-side, "I Can't Begin to Stop", was exclusive to the single. It was also written by Sharkey and Morgan, and produced by Beckett.

== Background ==
"I've Got News for You" was inspired by Sharkey's own personal life and the end of his relationship with Rebecca Landemere, a woman for whom he left his wife Ellen for in 1986. He told The Sunday People in 1991, "I'm lucky. I'm a songwriter and writing about Rebecca helped get all those emotions off my chest. I didn't shed a single tear at the end. Instead I off-loaded all my emotions, and all my unhappiness, into 'I've Got News for You'. I will never write a song like that again in my life. It is just too damn personal."

== Critical reception ==
Upon its release, Tim Peacock of Sounds described "I've Got News for You" as "a wishy-washy afterhours ballad of the first water". He added, "Admittedly, Feargal sounds like he's given it all he's got, but despite a gargantuan sax solo, this just drifts around like an ageing lounge lizard. Sad." Julian Cope of New Musical Express considered it "really duff" with a lyric that "doesn't make much sense". John Mangan of The Age commented, "This one is a syrupy ballad with more than a hint of the '50s. It's agonisingly predictable, but your man does have a decent voice." Evening Herald stated, "Despite the obvious pop appeal of his pristine single "I've Got News for You", [Sharkey's] album is shockingly ordinary." Music & Media wrote, "Sharkey comes back stronger than before. A soul-jewel."

== Formats ==
7" single
No.	Title	Written by	Length
1.	"I've Got News for You"	Feargal Sharkey, Dennis Morgan	4:18
2.	"I Can't Begin to Stop"	Sharkey, Morgan	5:02

12" single
No.	Title	Written by	Length
1.	"I've Got News for You"	Sharkey, Morgan	4:52
2.	"Loving You"	Sharkey, Jo Callis	4:15
3.	"A Good Heart"	Maria McKee	4:39
4.	"You Little Thief (Special Remix)"	Benmont Tench	6:13

CD single
No.	Title	Written by	Length
1.	"I've Got News for You"	Sharkey, Morgan	4:52
2.	"Loving You"	Sharkey, Callis	4:15
3.	"After the Mardi Gras"	Sharkey, Greg Barnhill	4:29
4.	"Cold Cold Streets"	Danny Kortchmar, David Lasley, Sharkey	5:20

Cassette single
No.	Title	Written by	Length
1.	"I've Got News for You"	Sharkey, Morgan	4:52
2.	"I Can't Begin to Stop"	Sharkey, Morgan	5:02

== Personnel ==
- Feargal Sharkey – lead vocals, producer of "You Little Thief (Special Remix)"
- Barry Beckett – producer of "I've Got News for You" and "I Can't Begin to Stop"
- Alan Beukers – front cover photography
- Roger Taylor, David Richards – producers of "Loving You"
- David A. Stewart – producer of "A Good Heart"

== Charts ==
Chart (1991)	Peak position
Australia (ARIA)	193
Europe (European Hit Radio)	12
Ireland (Irish Singles Chart)	8
UK Singles (OCC)	12
UK Airplay (Music Week)	5
