= Women & I =

1991 song by Feargal Sharkey

Single by Feargal Sharkey

from the album Songs from the Mardi Gras
- Released: 27 May 1991
- Length: 4:43
- Label: Virgin
- Songwriter(s): Feargal Sharkey: Mick Kitson
- Producer(s): Barry Beckett

Feargal Sharkey singles chronology
"I've Got News for You" (1991)	"Women & I" (1991)	"To Miss Someone" (1991)

"Women & I" is a song by Northern Irish singer Feargal Sharkey, released on 27 May 1991 as the second single from his third studio album Songs from the Mardi Gras. The song was written by Sharkey and Mick Kitson, and produced by Barry Beckett.

"Women & I" was the follow-up single to "I've Got News for You", which scored Sharkey a top 20 entry in the UK Singles Chart earlier in the year. "Women & I" failed to replicate its success and did not reach the top 75, stalling at number 86, but it was a radio hit and peaked at number 13 on the Music Week Playlist Chart in June 1991.

== Background ==
Like other songs on Songs from the Mardi Gras, "Women & I" was inspired by Sharkey's own personal life and the end of his relationship with Rebecca Landemere, a woman for whom he left his wife Ellen for in 1986. He told The Sunday People in 1991, "Most men go out and get drunk when love dies. I'm lucky. I'm a songwriter and writing about Rebecca helped get all those emotions off my chest."

== Critical reception ==
Upon its release as a single, Barbara Ellen of NME felt "Women & I" was "not a good single" and noted Sharkey's recent move towards an "MOR" sound when his voice sounds "far too interesting and enigmatic to make housewives swoon". She wrote, "Feargal seems almost afraid of the song's delicacy and pussyfoots around when he should be letting rip. What really wrecks it though is the intrusive backing vocals which sound like someone is yelling to their mates at the bar whilst sat on Feargal's face." Andrew Hirst of the Huddersfield Daily Examiner was more positive, commenting that "Sharkey's gilded larynx endears this refined offering with an all-embracing soul caress". Peter Kinghorn of the Newcastle Evening Chronicle described the song as a "gently building ballad with piano and organ to the fore".

The Rhondda Leader noted that the lyrics of "Women & I", as well as the preceding single "I've Got News for You", suggested that "poor old Feargal [has] had a bit of a rough time where women are concerned". They added, "I can't help wondering what he would have made of himself back in the days of 'Teenage Kicks' and the like, but the fact of the matter is that he writes and sings some beautiful songs and this is a prime example." In Australia, John Mangan of The Age stated, "Misery, tears, pain, broken hearts and lost love – what was it this reminded me of? Suddenly it struck me – Sharkey is the thinking man's Rod Stewart, a sort of down-market Celtic Morrissey." He added that the song's demo version, included on the CD format of the single, "shows it's frightening what you can do with a four-track recorder, a drum machine and the funky bass sound on your synthesiser".

== Track listing ==
7-inch (UK, Europe and Australia) and cassette single (UK)

1. "Women & I" – 4:46
2. "I'll Take It Back" (Live) – 4:10

12-inch (UK)

1. "Women & I" (Piano version) – 7:14
2. "Women & I" – 4:46
3. "I'll Take It Back" (Live) – 4:10

CD single (UK, Germany and Australia)

1. "Women & I" – 4:46
2. "Women & I" (Original demo) – 4:43
3. "Women & I" (featuring Don Potter) – 4:46
4. "Women & I" (Parts 1 & 2) – 5:27

CD limited edition collector's box set single (UK)

1. "Women & I" – 4:46
2. "I'll Take It Back" (Live) – 4:10
3. "Never Never" (The Assembly) – 3:45
4. "Women & I" (Piano version) – 7:14

== Personnel ==
Production

- Barry Beckett – producer on "Women & I"
- Justin Niebank – mixing on "Women & I", mixing on "Part 2" of "Women & I (Parts 1 & 2)"
- Feargal Sharkey – producer on "I'll Take It Back", additional production on "Women & I (Piano version)" and "Part 1" of "Women & I (Parts 1 & 2)"
- Andy Mason – mixing on "I'll Take It Back", mixing on "Women & I (Piano version)" and "Part 1" of "Women & I (Parts 1 & 2)"
- The Assembly – producers on "Never Never"

Other

- Idest – sleeve design
- Pete Smith – photography

== Charts ==
Chart (1991)	Peak position
Europe Airplay Top 50 (Music & Media)	47
UK Singles Chart (OCC)	86
UK Playlist Chart (Music Week)	13
