= Wish (Feargal Sharkey album) =

Studio album by Feargal Sharkey
- Released: 28 March 1988
- Studio: A&M (Hollywood, Los Angeles, California)
- Genre: Pop
- Label: Virgin
- Producer: Danny Kortchmar

Feargal Sharkey chronology
Feargal Sharkey (1985)	Wish (1988)	Songs from the Mardi Gras (1991)

Alternative cover
- U.S. album cover

Wish is the second solo studio album of former Undertones singer Feargal Sharkey, released by Virgin Records on 28 March 1988. As the follow-up to his successful self-titled solo debut, Wish received mixed reviews and was not as commercially successful as its predecessor.

== Background ==
Wish was recorded after Sharkey had taken a break of several months from the music industry. He completed a tour to promote his debut album in August 1986, then had to deal with the death of his mother, something which took him "an awfully long time to recover from". After a period of self-reflection, during which time he was not "even vaguely interested in making music", Sharkey decided to move away from London. For his second album, he wanted to work with American musicians, including guitarist Danny Kortchmar, who would produce the album, so he moved to Los Angeles in 1987. Sharkey was "intrigued" by Kortchmar's background in working with artists such as Carole King and Jackson Browne, whom he considered to be "songwriters in the old tradition rather than modern day producers".

Recording sessions commenced in May 1987. Responding to some criticism that his 1985 debut album was "bland pop music", Sharkey made a "far more conscious effort" in terms of songwriting for Wish. Sharkey told the Wokingham Times in 1988 that the album "deals with my life in the last two years and a blues/soul feel seemed the best way to express that". Ahead of its release, Sharkey said to the Sunday Independent: "I've never devoted myself so much to an album before, so if it comes out, and nobody gives a damn about it, I would be extremely disappointed, to say the least."

Despite the UK top 20 success of his 1985 debut album, Wish was a commercial disappointment, failing to reach the top 100 of the UK albums chart. It also failed to make an appearance on the US Billboard or Cash Box charts. The lead single, "More Love", preceded the album in January 1988 and stalled at number 44 on the UK singles chart. The second single, "Out of My System", was released in March 1988, but failed to chart. In the US and Canada, "If This Is Love" was the only single to be released from the album.

"Blue Days" was inspired by the Troubles in Northern Ireland. Sharkey told the Sunday Independent: "It's about my last return to Derry, and how soul-destroying I found it, seeing what living there has done to all my old friends." He added to Record Mirror: "I wrote the song because I believe that at the end of the day, despite sectarian differences, nobody is happy with what's going on in Ireland." The title was inspired by Rev Ian Paisley's comment: "We will never forsake the blue skies of Ulster for the grey mists of an Irish republic."

== Critical reception ==
Professional ratings
Review scores
Source	Rating
AllMusic	3/5 stars
NME	6/10
Number One	4/5 stars
Record Mirror	2.5/5 stars
Smash Hits	4/10

Upon its release, John Aizlewood of Number One wrote, "So why is our Fearg hitless? One things for sure, it can't be the music. Wish is a steady grower which creeps up on you like exams, only it's fun to listen to! And does that voice fair quiver? It does indeed. Nice one Fearg, ignore the barrackers." John Tobler of Music Week called the album a "grower" which shows Sharkey's "promising ability as a songwriter". He concluded, "Altogether, an album which will consolidate Sharkey's position, perhaps without greatly increasing his stature immediately."

In a mixed review, Neil Taylor of NME described the album as "AOR meets soul", on which the "high points are those tracks where sincerity and not synthesis is the key". Taylor praised Sharkey's "million dollar voice" and felt it was "majestically exploited" on the slower tracks, whereas the more uptempo ones "lack guts" and "have a contrived bite and appear a shade bland". He also noted that Sharkey's "commercial growth has been more or less matched by his Americanisation". Pete Paisley, writing for Record Mirror, stated that the "10 lovelorn laments" have "emphasis on crisp, hi-tech arrangements over feel". He also praised Sharkey's "quavering" and "emotionally fired" vocals, but felt the album is "all a little too well-coiffured and designer soul-ish to make you want to fully wish on this ascendant star". Lola Borg of Smash Hits considered the album to be full of "slow, pale imitations" of its lead single, "More Love", with an "unhappy Feargal soul searching about love, pain and stuff". She added that Sharkey's "very lovely voice" was "wasted on these plodding, over-orchestrated and unexciting croons".

In the US, Billboard described Wish as an "even-better follow-up" to Sharkey's debut and one that "should soon be sitting firmly at the top of the charts". Cash Box called it a "slickly-crafted collection of pop numbers that should finally enable the artist the edge at Top 40 radio he deserves". Stereo Review commented, "The first solo album by Sharkey was so subtle and understated that much of it barely registered. This time around, he's made a record that cannot go unnoticed. With the help of producer Danny Kortchmar, whose guitar playing is the instrumental heart of the album, Sharkey takes a measured soul turn." The reviewer praised five of the tracks as "very good gems", but felt the rest of material "gets thin".

== In popular culture ==
The album is partially heard and mentioned in the 1990 Christmas Special episode of "Only Fools and Horses", in which the character Rodney Trotter bought a copy of the album for his wife Casandra as a Birthday present.

== Track listing ==
A-side
No.	Title	Writer(s)	Length
1.	"Cold, Cold Streets"	Danny Kortchmar, David Lasley, Feargal Sharkey	5:16
2.	"More Love"	Benmont Tench	4:35
3.	"Full Confession"	Danny Kortchmar, Feargal Sharkey, Tim Daly	3:54
4.	"Please Don't Believe in Me"	David A. Stewart, Feargal Sharkey, Tim Daly	4:49
5.	"Out of My System"	Eddie Chacon, Suzanne Valentine	4:19

B-side
No.	Title	Writer(s)	Length
1.	"If This Is Love"	Feargal Sharkey, Maggie Lee, Tim Daly	3:43
2.	"Strangest Girl in Paradise"	Danny Kortchmar, Feargal Sharkey	4:20
3.	"Blue Days"	Danny Kortchmar, Feargal Sharkey, Waddy Wachtel	4:09
4.	"Let Me Be"	Feargal Sharkey, Mark Goldenberg	3:13
5.	"Safe to Touch"	Feargal Sharkey, Steve Jordan	4:10

The CD release contains three changes to the track listing.

CD release
No.	Title	Writer(s)	Length
6.	"Strangest Girl in Paradise"	Danny Kortchmar, Feargal Sharkey	4:20
7.	"Let Me Be"	Feargal Sharkey, Mark Goldenberg	3:13
9.	"If This Is Love"	Feargal Sharkey, Maggie Lee, Tim Daly	3:43

== Charts ==
Chart (1988)	Peak position
Australia (Kent Music Report)	66
Swedish Albums Chart	22

== Personnel ==
- Feargal Sharkey – vocals
- Beverly D'Angelo – backing vocals (6)
- Charley Drayton – guitar, backing vocals (10)
- Mike Finnigan – organ (2)
- Bob Glaub – bass (2, 8)
- Mark Goldenberg – organ, synthesizer, guitar (9)
- Steve Jordan – drums (1–10)
- Danny Kortchmar – guitar (1–10), bass (1, 3, 7, 8)
- Russ Kunkel – percussion (4)
- David Lasley – backing vocals (1–3, 5–7, 9)
- Maggie Lee – synthesizer, backing vocals (6)
- Arnold McCuller – backing vocals (1–3, 6, 7, 9)
- David Paich – synthesizer, piano (4)
- Keith Richards – guitar (2)
- Jack Sherman – electric 12-string (6)
- Leland Sklar – bass (4, 6)
- Myna Smith Schilling – backing vocals (5)
- Benmont Tench – organ (2, 5, 7)
- Waddy Wachtel – guitar (2, 4, 6, 8)
- Jimmy "Z" Zavala – saxophone (2), harmonica (2)
- Anthony J. Davies – backing vocals, cello (4), keyboards (7, 9), dube (3)

Technical

- Richard Haughton – photography
- Gary Wathen – art direction
