= Love's Been Rough on Me =

Love's Been Rough On Me

Studio album by Etta James
- Released: April 29, 1997
- Genre: Blues
- Length: 41:07
- Label: Private Music
- Producer: Barry Beckett

Etta James chronology
Time After Time (1995)	Love's Been Rough On Me (1997)	Life, Love & the Blues (1998)

Professional ratings
Review scores
Source	Rating
AllMusic	3/5 stars

Love's Been Rough on Me is the twentieth studio album by Etta James, released in 1997 through Private Music. AllMusic noted "... a record that delivers the real goods with grace and style".

The album reached a peak position of number 6 on the Billboard Top Blues Albums chart.

== Track listing ==
No.	Title	Writer(s)	Length
1.	"The Rock"	Russell Smith, Jim Varsos	3:34
2.	"Cry Like a Rainy Day"	Greg Barnhill, Kenny Greenberg	5:22
3.	"Love's Been Rough on Me"	Gretchen Peters	3:09
4.	"Love It or Leave It Alone"	Lara Cody, Will Jennings, John Keller	5:30
5.	"Don't Touch Me"	Hank Cochran	3:58
6.	"Hold Me"	Graham Lyle, Troy Seals	3:47
7.	"If I Had Any Pride Left at All"	John Greenebaum, Seals, Eddie Setser	3:49
8.	"I Can Give You Everything"	Al Anderson, Terry Anderson	3:17
9.	"I've Been Loving You Too Long"	Jerry Butler, Otis Redding	4:22
10.	"Done in the Dark"	James, Sklair	4:19

== Personnel ==
- Etta James – lead vocals

Backing vocalists

- Vicki Hampton
- Yvonne Hodges
- Donna McElroy
- Louis Dean Nunley
- John Wesley Ryles
- Dennis Wilson
- Curtis Young

Musicians

- Eddie Bayers – drums
- Barry Beckett – keyboards
- Paul Franklin – steel guitar
- Mike Haynes – trumpet
- Jim Horn – saxophone
- Dann Huff – electric guitar
- Sam Levine – saxophone
- Chris McDonald – trombone
- Joe McGlohon – saxophone
- Terry McMillan – percussion
- Steve Nathan – keyboards
- Don Potter – acoustic guitar
- Michael Rhodes – bass guitar
- Brent Rowan – electric guitar
- Josh Sklair – electric guitar
