= I've Got News for You =

I've Got News for You may refer to:

- "I've Got News for You" (Feargal Sharkey song), a song by Feargal Sharkey
- "I've Got News for You", a song written by Roy Alfred and performed by Ray Charles on his album Genius + Soul = Jazz
