= Heart of a Woman (album) =

1999 studio album by Etta James

Studio album by Etta James
- Released: June 29, 1999
- Recorded: March 15–23, 1999
- Genre: Jazz
- Length: 66:14
- Label: RCA
- Producers: Etta James; John Snyder; Lupe DeLeon

Etta James chronology
12 Songs of Christmas (1998)	Heart of a Woman (1999)	Matriarch of the Blues (2000)

Heart of a Woman is the twenty-third studio album by Etta James released in June 1999 by RCA Records. The album consists of eleven love songs from her favorite female singers as well as a recording of her most popular song, "At Last". Recorded in March 1999, Heart of a Woman was produced by James and John Snyder with Lupe DeLeon as executive producer. James' two sons Donto and Sametto served as assistant producers. Guest musicians appearing on the album include Mike Finnigan, Red Holloway, and Jimmy Zavala. Critical reception of Heart of a Woman was mixed. The album peaked at number four on the Top Blues Albums chart of Billboard magazine.

== Background and composition ==
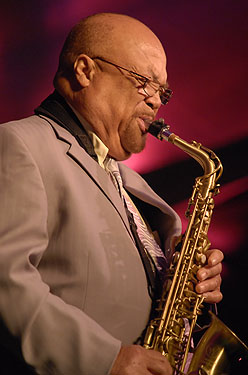
Red Holloway performed saxophone on "My Old Flame".

Heart of a Woman was released during a period of James' career in which she parted from singing blues to experiment with country, jazz, and pop music, with mixed reception. Rolling Stone grouped the album in a "trifecta" with James' previous (not counting the 1998 holiday album 12 Songs of Christmas), and following studio albums, Life, Love & the Blues (1998) and Matriarch of the Blues (2000).

Categorized by Rolling Stone as a jazz pop album, Heart of a Woman contains "cool, sensuous arrangements" between four and seven minutes in length. It consists of eleven love songs by James' favorite female singers, including Billie Holiday, Carmen McRae, Sarah Vaughan, and Dinah Washington, along with a new recording of her most famous song "At Last". The album was recorded in March 1999, and produced by James and John Snyder, with Lupe DeLeon serving as executive producer. James' two sons, Donto and Sametto, served as assistant producers, among other contributions. Guest musicians appearing on the album included: Mike Finnigan on organ, Red Holloway and Jimmy Zavala on tenor saxophone, and Lee Thornburg on multiple instruments.

Gene de Paul and Don Raye's "You Don't Know What Love Is" opens the album, followed by "Good Morning Heartache", written by Ervin Drake, Dan Fisher, and Irene Higginbotham. The bossa nova arrangement of Sam Coslow and Arthur Johnston's "My Old Flame" contains a saxophone solo by Red Holloway. Irving Berlin's "Say It Isn't So" is followed by James' signature song "At Last", written originally by Mack Gordon and Harry Warren.

Other love songs on the album include "Tenderly" by Walter Gross and Jack Lawrence, and "I Only Have Eyes for You" by Al Dubin. James' vocals on Duke Ellington and Paul Francis Webster's "I Got It Bad (and That Ain't Good)" are "barely audible" as she sings "... I... can't... live without him." "I Got It Bad" is followed by a cover of John Frederick Coots and Haven Gillespie's 1933 popular song "You Go to My Head". Mike Finnigan performs the Hammond organ solo on "A Sunday Kind of Love" and throughout the album, filling the gap between blues and jazz music. Closing the album are Sammy Cahn and Saul Chaplin's "If It's the Last Thing I Do", and Alice Cooper's "Only Women Bleed". James had recorded "Only Women Bleed" previously.

== Reception ==
Professional ratings
Review scores
Source	Rating
AllMusic	2.5/5 stars 3/5 stars
Robert Christgau	(2-star Honorable Mention)
PopMatters	8/10 stars
Rolling Stone	4/5 stars

Critical reception of the album was mixed. PopMatters' review concluded that, given proper arrangements and material, James delivered jazz standards "with the same devastating power" demonstrated on past blues performances. Staff wrote that James combined jazz and blues elements successfully, "[creating] the sense of loneliness and desperation in which James has always excelled in expressing". PopMatters' review was positive overall, claiming James' rough voice made her appear to be "in tune with the woeful nature" of the songs, though it insisted that her cover of "Only Women Bleed" was a "miscalculation of major proportions". AllMusic's Stephen Thomas Erlewine called James one of the best blues performers of the twentieth century and wrote in his review of the album that "she still possesses an exceptionally strong voice, robust and filled with passion." However, Erlewine also wrote that Heart of a Woman "never has the emotional impact James intended it to have". Music critic Robert Christgau's review simply reads "Torching cocktail cool" and recommended the tracks "My Old Flame", and "I Only Have Eyes for You". The Advocate's Andrew Velez felt that "I Got It Bad (and That Ain't Good)" was the album's best track. "Steve Knopper of the Chicago Tribune thought the arrangements were "tinkly" and "meandering", with James sounding as through "she's learning a foreign language". Knopper considered "Only Women Bleed" to be the album's most soulful track.

== Track listing ==
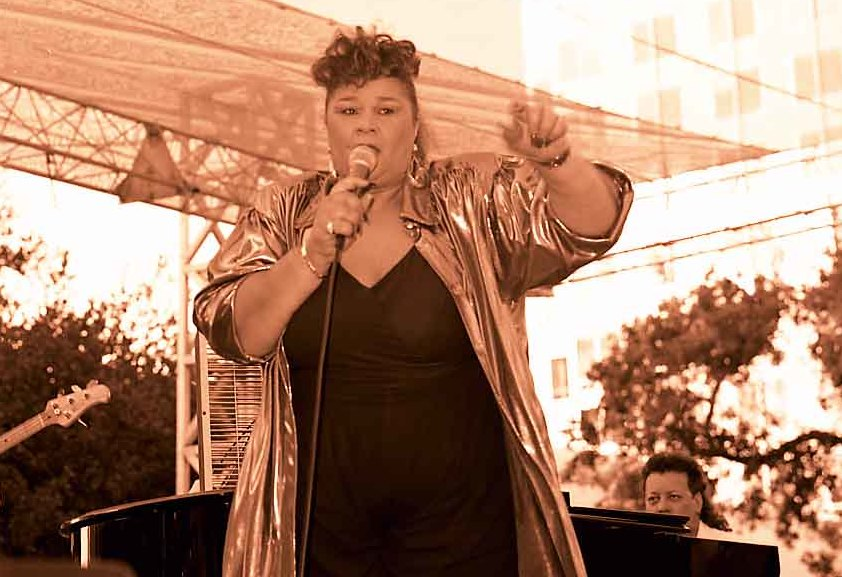
Etta James performing in 2000

1. "You Don't Know What Love Is" (Gene de Paul, Don Raye) – 5:28
2. "Good Morning Heartache" (Ervin Drake, Dan Fisher, Irene Higgenbotham) – 5:28
3. "My Old Flame" (Sam Coslow, Arthur Johnston) – 6:20
4. "Say It Isn't So" (Irving Berlin) – 4:55
5. "At Last" (Mack Gordon, Harry Warren) – 4:40
6. "Tenderly" (Walter Gross, Jack Lawrence) – 5:27
7. "I Only Have Eyes for You" (Al Dubin, Warren) – 6:35
8. "I Got It Bad (and That Ain't Good)" (Duke Ellington, Paul Francis Webster) – 6:25
9. "You Go to My Head" (John Frederick Coots, Haven Gillespie) – 4:21
10. "A Sunday Kind of Love" (Barbara Belle, Anita Leonard, Louis Prima, Stan Rhodes) – 6:00
11. "If It's the Last Thing I Do" (Sammy Cahn, Saul Chaplin) – 5:47
12. "Only Women Bleed" (Alice Cooper, Dick Wagner) – 4:48

Track listing adapted from AllMusic.

== Personnel ==
- Rob Brill – assistant engineer
- Lupe DeLeon – executive producer
- Jeff Dunas – photography
- Pete Escovedo – conga, horn, percussion
- Mike Finnigan – organ
- Red Holloway – tenor saxophone
- Donto Metto James – assistant producer, drum programming, drums
- Etta James – arranger, art direction, liner notes, photography, producer, vocals
- Sametto James – assistant producer, bass, drum programming, production assistant
- Jimmy Zavala – tenor saxophone
- Dave Matthews – arranger, electric piano, piano
- Sonny Mediana – art direction, photography
- Bobby Murray – guitar
- Jay Newland – engineer, mastering
- Tom Poole – flugelhorn, trumpet
- Josh Sklair – acoustic guitar, arranger, assistant producer, director, electric guitar, musical director, production assistant
- John Snyder – producer
- Lee Thornburg – alto horn, flugelhorn, horn arrangements, trumpet, valve trombone

Credits adapted from AllMusic.

== Chart history ==
Heart of a Woman reached a peak position of number four on Billboard's Top Blues Albums chart. By November 1999, the album had remained on the chart for seventeen weeks, and remained at number twelve. In 1999, James had five albums chart in the United States: Life, Love & the Blues, Heart of a Woman, 12 Songs of Christmas (1998), as well as two compilation albums: Best of Etta James, and Her Best (1997).
