= Feargal Sharkey (album) =

Studio album by Feargal Sharkey
- Released: 11 November 1985
- Studios: The Church, London
- Genre: Pop
- Length: 42:59
- Labels: Virgin; A&M (U.S.)
- Producer: David A. Stewart

Feargal Sharkey chronology
| Feargal Sharkey (1985) | Wish (1988) |

Professional ratings
Review scores
| Source | Rating |
|---|---|
| AllMusic | 4/5 stars |
| Record Mirror | 4/5 stars |

Feargal Sharkey is the debut solo album by former Undertones singer Feargal Sharkey, released in 1985. The album peaked at No. 12 in the UK and contains Sharkey's best known single, "A Good Heart", his only No. 1. "You Little Thief" also became a top 10 hit in the UK Singles Chart, reaching No. 5, and "Someone to Somebody" reached No. 64.

== Production ==
The album was produced by Dave Stewart of the Eurythmics who Sharkey had met in an elevator seven years previously. Sharkey said, "We both had the same commitment to excellence, to finding great songs. Whether they were our own or other people's didn't matter."

== Reception ==
Spin said, "Feargal Sharkey features a few great songs, though none of them were composed by Sharkey and Stewart: The three stand-out tracks were written by Chrissie Hynde, Bobby Womack, and Maria McKee of Lone Justice." Armond White said, "Packaging a singer this odd requires a certain degree of Top-40 costuming, and Stewart is the Bob Mackie of producers. His familiar, eager imitation of any known style slips unavoidably into parody. But Sharkey is pretty crafty himself, using his rough stammer. This is the sound of pure stress, not soul."

== Track listing ==
CD and download release
| No. | Title | Writer(s) | Length |
|---|---|---|---|
| 1. | "A Good Heart" | Maria McKee | 4:39 |
| 2. | "You Little Thief" | Benmont Tench | 5:03 |
| 3. | "Ghost Train" | Dave Stewart; Feargal Sharkey; Tim Daly | 3:12 |
| 4. | "Ashes and Diamonds" | Stewart; Sharkey | 4:40 |
| 5. | "Made to Measure" | Chrissie Hynde | 3:38 |
| 6. | "Someone to Somebody" | Daniel Kane; Geraldine L. Gooden; Michael Torrence; Thomas Gordy | 5:24 |
| 7. | "Don't Leave It to Nature" | Anthony Moore; Sharkey | 4:27 |
| 8. | "Love and Hate" | Stewart; Sharkey; Daly | 4:35 |
| 9. | "Bitter Man" | Stewart; Sharkey; Daly | 3:28 |
| 10. | "It's All Over Now" | Bobby Womack; Shirley Womack | 4:15 |

== Personnel ==
- Feargal Sharkey – lead vocals, synthesizer, percussion, sequencer programming, backing vocals, design concept
- Dean Garcia – bass
- Richard Morcombe – guitar
- Davey Payne – flute, saxophone
- Dave Plews – trumpet
- Jimmy Z – harmonica
- Olle Romo – drums
- Patrick Seymour – keyboards
- Molly Duncan – saxophone
- Michael Kamen – string arrangement, conductor
- Boy George – backing vocals
- Debra Byrd – backing vocals
- Freida Williams – backing vocals
- Martin Chambers – drums
- Nathan East – bass
- David A. Stewart – guitar, backing vocals

Technical

- Jon Bavin, Michael Schuman, Robin Laine, Tom Nist – engineer
- Don Smith, Shelly Yakus – mixing
- Hugh Brown – front cover photography

== Chart performance ==
| Chart (1985–86) | Peak position |
|---|---|
| Australia (Kent Music Report) | 7 |
| Canadian Albums Chart | 17 |
| German Albums Chart | 29 |
| New Zealand Albums Chart | 16 |
| Swiss Albums Chart | 11 |
| UK Albums Chart | 12 |
| US Billboard 200 | 75 |

=== Year-end charts ===
| Chart (1986) | Position |
|---|---|
| Australia (Kent Music Report) | 20 |
