= 12 Songs of Christmas =

12 Songs of Christmas may refer to:

- 12 Songs of Christmas (Frank Sinatra, Bing Crosby, and Fred Waring album)
- 12 Songs of Christmas (Etta James album)
- Twelve Songs of Christmas, an album by Jim Reeves
