= Jimmy Zavala =

American musician (born 1955)

- Also known as: Jimmy Z
- Born: James Zavala; February 7, 1955 (age 71)
- Origin: North Highlands, California, U.S.
- Genres: Rock, funk, blues
- Occupations: Musician, songwriter, producer
- Instruments: Flute, harmonica, saxophone (baritone, soprano, tenor)
- Years active: 1980–present
- Labels: IRS (1980s); Ruthless (1991); Boneyardsrecords (2003) (with the ZTribe); Zavala Songs, Inc. (2004) (with the ZTribe)
- Website: ztribe.com

Jimmy 'Z' Zavala (born February 7, 1955) is an American musician. He is notable for playing harmonica on the Eurythmics song "Missionary Man" and performing with the band live. He also played and recorded on four multiple platinum albums and three world tours as part of Rod Stewart's band and appears on "Weird Al" Yankovic's albums "Weird Al" Yankovic in 3-D, Dare to Be Stupid and UHF – Original Motion Picture Soundtrack and Other Stuff. As a studio musician, he also played with Etta James, Tom Petty, Ziggy Marley and Bon Jovi. On his album Muzical Madness, he collaborated with Dr. Dre and ventured into hip-hop.

== Discography ==
- Anytime... Anyplace! (1988)
- Muzical Madness (1991)
- Caught Inside (2003)
- Corazón Y Alma de un Jaguar (The Heart and Soul of a Jaguar) (2004)
- That's The Way I Roll (2014)

== Collaborations ==
- Tonight I'm Yours - Rod Stewart (1981)
- Body Wishes - Rod Stewart (1983)
- Inside the Fire - Rita Coolidge (1984)
- Camouflage - Rod Stewart (1984)
- Revenge - Eurythmics (1986)
- Live - Eurythmics (1987)
- "More Love" - Feargal Sharkey (1987)
- Big Generator - Yes (1987)
- Live 1983–1989 - Eurythmics
- City Streets - Carole King (1989)
- Ghetto Cowboy - Mo Thugs Family (1998)
- Life, Love & the Blues - Etta James (1998)
- Heart of a Woman - Etta James (1999)
- Matriarch of the Blues - Etta James (2000)
- Missundaztood - P!nk (2001)
- Let's Roll - Etta James (2003)
- Postcards from Paradise - Ringo Starr (2015)
- West of Flushing South of Frisco - Supersonic Blues Machine (2016)
- Both Sides of the Track - Dennis Jones (2016)
- Tell the Truth - Lance Lopez (2018)
