= Out of My System =

Single by Feargal Sharkey

from the album Wish
- B-side: "A Touch of Blue"
- Released: 7 March 1988
- Genre: Pop
- Length: 4:18
- Label: Virgin Records
- Songwriters: Eddie Chacon, Suzanne Valentine
- Producer: Danny Kortchmar

Feargal Sharkey singles chronology
"More Love" (1988)	"Out of My System" (1988)	"If This is Love" (1988)

"Out of My System" is a song by Irish singer Feargal Sharkey, released on 7 March 1988 as the second single from his second studio album, Wish (1988). It was written by Eddie Chacon and Suzanne Valentine, and was produced by Danny Kortchmar. The song failed to enter the top 100 of the UK singles chart, but did make an appearance for two consecutive weeks on the Music Week Airplay chart based on the airplay it received on BBC Radio 1 and regional radio stations.

A music video was filmed to promote the single and Sharkey also performed the song on the Dutch show TopPop. The B-side, "A Touch of Blue", was exclusive to the single, and was written by Sharkey and Tim Daly, and produced by Sharkey. The CD format of the single also featured the track "Blue Days", which was an album track from Wish.

== Reception ==
Upon its release, Music & Media commented: "With its compelling, funky beat and guitars, its irresistible chorus and the urging vocals, this is the best we have heard from Sharkey for a long time." Paul Massey of the Aberdeen Evening Express described the song as "light soulful pop that's better than his previous chart successes." The Pinner Observer wrote: "Old Ferg may not be an oil painting, but he knows how to sing in this catchy chartbound number."

Jill Turner of the Reading Evening Post stated: "Boppy little track from Feargal. Maybe not quite as catchy or original as his former hits. Pity he had to pick the old cliche 'got to get you out of my system and into my life' a la Billy Ocean." Wendy Tuohy of The Age wrote: "Feargal sounds a little more like Rod Stewart than usual in delivering this quite soulful song. This effort does not jump out at you on the first couple of listens but is most probably a grower."

Ro Newton of Smash Hits commented: "This latest single is an unremarkable song with a ploddy soul beat, but at least Feargal still warbles on in the way only he knows how." Robin Smith of Record Mirror stated, "This sounds truly desperate as Feargie comes down with a severe attack of the Terence Trent D'Arbys. A meandering piece of slow funk on a long fuse that really doesn't ignite anything. You can't hear much depth of feeling or commitment here."

== Formats ==
7" single
No.	Title	Written by	Length
1.	"Out of My System"	Eddie Chacon, Suzanne Valentine	4:18
2.	"A Touch of Blue"	Feargal Sharkey, Tim Daly	3:27

12" single
No.	Title	Written by	Length
1.	"Out Of My System (The Popstand Delmonte Mix)"	Chacon, Valentine	6:48
2.	"Out Of My System (The Delmonte Dub)"	Chacon, Valentine	6:56
3.	"A Touch of Blue"	Sharkey, Daly	3:27

CD single
No.	Title	Written by	Length
1.	"Out Of My System (7" Version)"	Chacon, Valentine	4:18
2.	"Blue Days"	Kortchmar, Sharkey, Waddy Wachtel	4:13
3.	"Out Of My System (The Popstand Delmonte Mix)"	Chacon, Valentine	6:51
4.	"A Touch of Blue"	Sharkey, Daly	3:27

== Personnel ==
- Feargal Sharkey - lead vocals, producer and mixing on "A Touch of Blue"
- Danny Kortchmar - producer of "Out of My System" and "Blue Days"
- Shelly Yakus, Marc De Sisto - mixing on "Out of My System"
- Justin Strauss, Murray Elias - producers and remixers on "Out of My System (The Popstand Delmonte Mix)"
- Eric Kupper - programming on "Out of My System (The Popstand Delmonte Mix)"
- Hugo Dwyer - engineer on "Out of My System (The Popstand Delmonte Mix)"
- Mark Plotty - editor on "Out of My System (The Popstand Delmonte Mix)"
- Richard Haughton - photography
- The Design Clinic - CD sleeve
