= Feargal Sharkey =

Northern Ireland singer (born 1958)

Feargal Sharkey OBE
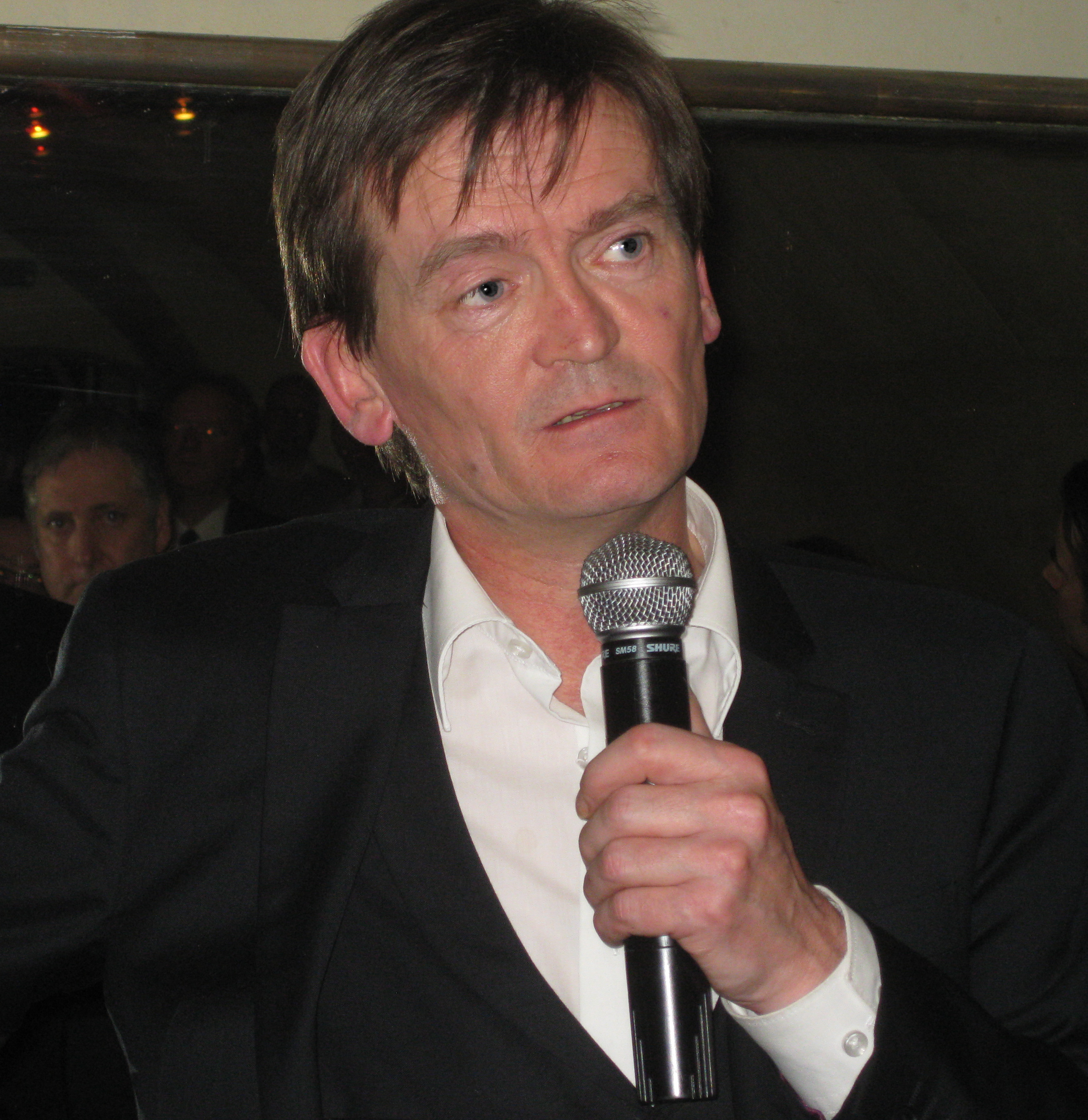
- Sharkey in 2009

Background information
- Born: Seán Feargal Sharkey; 13 August 1958 (age 68); Derry, Northern Ireland
- Genres: Punk rock; new wave; pop-punk; power pop; pop rock; pop
- Occupations: Singer; songwriter; music manager; political activist; environmentalist
- Instruments: Vocals; keyboards; percussion
- Years active: 1975–1991 (as an active performer); 1992–present (within music management)
- Labels: Virgin Records; A&M Records (US); Zarjazz Records
- Formerly of: The Undertones, The Assembly

Seán Feargal Sharkey OBE (born 13 August 1958) is a singer and environmentalist from Derry, Northern Ireland. He was the lead vocalist of the punk band The Undertones in the 1970s and 1980s, and became a solo artist in the 1980s and 1990s. His 1985 solo single "A Good Heart" was a number-one hit in the United Kingdom, Australia, Belgium, Ireland, and the Netherlands. After becoming less musically active in the early 1990s, he has performed various roles supporting the UK's commercial music industry, winning several awards and honours for his work in that area.

Sharkey is a lifelong fly fisherman, and has campaigned against the pollution of British rivers (particularly chalk streams). He is the Chairman of the Amwell Magna Fishery. He has become a figurehead for the campaign to prevent water companies dumping sewage into UK waterways and coasts.

== Biography ==
=== The Undertones (1975–1983) ===
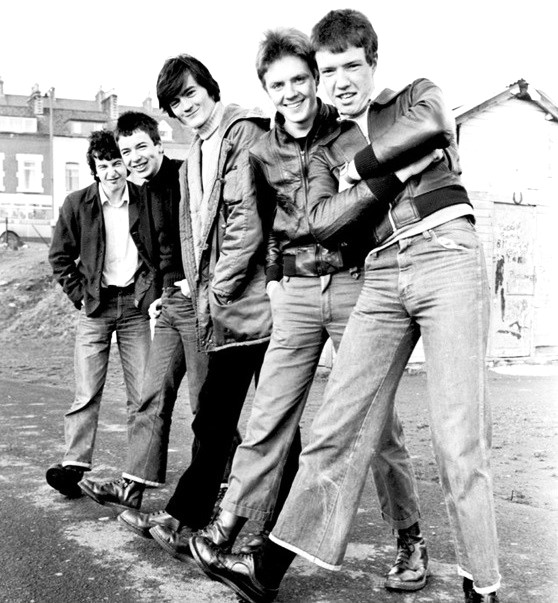
Sharkey (centre), pictured with the Undertones in January 1979

Sharkey, who was born in Derry, Northern Ireland, joined the Undertones shortly after their formation in 1975. They had several UK hits, with songs such as "Teenage Kicks", "Here Comes The Summer", "My Perfect Cousin", "Wednesday Week" and "It's Going to Happen!". The band split in 1983 citing musical differences, with Sharkey pursuing a solo career and other members of the band forming That Petrol Emotion the following year.

=== The Assembly (1983) ===
Before his solo career took off, Sharkey was the singer of the one-shot group The Assembly with ex-Yazoo and Depeche Mode member Vince Clarke (pre-Erasure). In 1983, their single "Never Never" was a No. 4 hit in the UK Singles Chart.

=== Solo career (1984–1991) ===
Sharkey's debut single was a collaboration with Madness member Cathal Smyth titled "Listen to Your Father". The single was released on Madness's label Zarjazz Records in 1984, reaching No. 23 in the UK chart. The track was performed on Top of the Pops with members of Madness.

Sharkey's solo work was significantly different to the post-punk offerings of The Undertones. His best-known solo material is the 1985 UK chart-topping single penned by Lone Justice frontwoman Maria McKee, "A Good Heart", which went to No. 1 in several countries including the UK in late 1985. He had a UK Top 5 hit in 1986 with "You Little Thief". His eponymous debut album reached No. 12 in the UK Albums Chart.

Following on from his second album Wish in 1988, he achieved further success in 1991 with his UK Top 30 album Songs From The Mardi Gras, which produced the No. 12 hit single "I've Got News for You".

=== Music industry (1992–present) ===
Starting in the early 1990s Sharkey moved into the business side of the music industry, initially in A&R for Polydor Records, and then as managing director of EXP Ltd. He was appointed a member of the Radio Authority for five years from December 1998 to December 2003.

When the Undertones reunited in 1999, Sharkey was offered the opportunity to rejoin the group but turned down the offer. His position as lead vocalist/frontman for the Undertones was taken by fellow Derry native Paul McLoone.

Sharkey became chairman of the UK Government task force the 'Live Music Forum' in 2004, to evaluate the impact of the Licensing Act 2003 on the performance of live music, and gave public evidence before the Culture, Media and Sport Committee on 11 November 2008.

In 2008, Sharkey was appointed as the CEO of British Music Rights, replacing Emma Pike. In October 2008, he became head of UK Music, an umbrella organisation representing the collective interests of the UK's commercial music industry. He has become prominent in criticising the use of Form 696 by the Metropolitan Police' requiring event promoters to provide data on performers and audiences. Sharkey resigned from UK Music on 11 November 2011.

In 2011, Sharkey made a one-off appearance in a set named Erasure + Special Guests, singing "Never Never". He stated that he had not sung live for 20 years and that Vince Clarke was the only person he would have returned for.

=== Awards and honours ===
In 2004, Sharkey was awarded the "Scott Piering Award", by the radio industry for "recognising achievement in the promotion of music and the understanding of the music industry to their colleagues in radio". He is the only member of the Radio Authority to have been honoured in this way by the radio industry.

In 2006, he received the "Bottle Award" at the International Live Music Conference for "outstanding contribution to the live music industry".

In 2008, Sharkey was awarded an Honorary Doctor of Arts, by the University of Hertfordshire in recognition of outstanding achievement in the field of music.

In 2010, he received a Doctor of Letters honoris causa from the University of Ulster in recognition of his services to music.

Sharkey was appointed Officer of the Order of the British Empire (OBE) in the 2019 Birthday Honours for services to music.

=== Environmental campaigning ===
Sharkey is a lifelong fly fisherman and has campaigned against the pollution of British rivers (particularly chalk streams), and the regulations of the water industry which affect British water resources. He gave the keynote address at The Rivers Trust Autumn Conference 2018.

On 25 May 2019, Sharkey was the guest on BBC Radio 4 Ramblings with presenter Clare Balding. The featured walk was along the River Hogsmill on the south London-Surrey border which is a part of the London Loop. Sharkey was able to discuss his concerns for the state of the River Hogsmill, and other chalk streams.

On 30 August 2020, Sharkey appeared in episode 2 of the third series of Mortimer & Whitehouse: Gone Fishing to discuss the environmental pressures faced by Britain's chalk streams, during a conversation beside the River Lea. He reappeared on episode 6 of the fifth series on 14 October 2022, discussing pollution in English rivers including the Thames and Wye. He is Chairman of the Amwell Magna Fishery.

He has subsequently become a figurehead for the campaign to prevent water companies dumping untreated sewage into UK waterways and coasts, appearing on television news coverage as well as supporting The Times' campaign to "clean it up".

== Discography ==
=== Studio albums ===
List of albums, with selected details, chart positions and certifications
| Title | Details | Peak chart positions | | | | | | | | | | Certifications |
| Title | Details | UK | AUS | CAN | FIN | GER | NLD | NZ | SWE | SWI | US | Certifications |
|---|---|---|---|---|---|---|---|---|---|---|---|---|
| Feargal Sharkey | Released: 11 November 1985; Label: Virgin | 12 | 7 | 17 | 13 | 29 | 6 | 16 | — | 11 | 75 | UK: Gold; CAN: Gold |
| Wish | Released: 28 March 1988; Label: Virgin | — | 66 | — | — | — | — | — | 22 | — | — | |
| Songs from the Mardi Gras | Released: 8 April 1991; Label: Virgin | 27 | — | — | — | — | — | — | 41 | — | — | |
"—" denotes a recording that did not chart or was not released in that territory.

=== Singles ===
List of singles, with selected chart positions and certifications
| Title | Year | Peak chart positions | | | | | | | | | | | Certifications | Album |
| Title | Year | UK | AUS | BEL | CAN | GER | IRE | ITA | NLD | NZ | SWI | US | Certifications | Album |
|---|---|---|---|---|---|---|---|---|---|---|---|---|---|---|
| "Listen to Your Father" | 1984 | 23 | — | — | — | — | 22 | — | — | — | — | — | | Non-album singles |
| "Loving You" | 1985 | 26 | 97 | — | — | — | — | — | — | — | 23 | — | | Non-album singles |
| "A Good Heart" | 1985 | 1 | 1 | 1 | 4 | 4 | 1 | 17 | 2 | 3 | 3 | 74 | UK: Gold; CAN: Gold; NZ: Gold | Feargal Sharkey |
| "You Little Thief" | 1985 | 5 | 4 | 9 | — | 30 | 3 | — | 10 | 38 | 27 | — | | Feargal Sharkey |
| "Someone to Somebody" | 1986 | 64 | 64 | — | — | — | 30 | — | — | — | — | — | | Feargal Sharkey |
| "It's All Over Now" | 1986 | — | — | — | — | — | — | — | — | — | — | — | | Feargal Sharkey |
| "More Love" | 1988 | 44 | 61 | — | — | — | — | — | 43 | — | — | — | | Wish |
| "Out of My System" | 1988 | — | — | — | — | — | — | 45 | — | — | — | — | | Wish |
| "If This Is Love" | 1988 | — | — | — | — | — | — | — | — | — | — | — | | Wish |
| "I've Got News for You" | 1991 | 12 | 193 | — | — | — | 8 | — | — | — | — | — | | Songs from the Mardi Gras |
| "Women & I" | 1991 | 86 | — | — | — | — | — | — | — | — | — | — | | Songs from the Mardi Gras |
| "To Miss Someone" | 1991 | 102 | — | — | — | — | — | — | — | — | — | — | | Songs from the Mardi Gras |
"—" denotes a recording that did not chart or was not released in that territory.

==== Promotional singles ====
List of promotional singles
| Title | Year | Album |
|---|---|---|
| "Cry Like a Rainy Day" | 1991 | Songs from the Mardi Gras |
