= Form 696 =

Metropolitan Police risk assessment

Form 696 from the Metropolitan Police web site

Form 696 was a risk assessment form used by the Greater London Metropolitan Police from 2008 to 2017, which requested promoters and licensees of events to complete and submit 14 days in advance of an event in 21 London boroughs. Non-compliance with this could result in police opposition to event licences being granted.

This form became controversial due to its stipulation that names, stage names, private addresses, and phone numbers of all promoters, DJs and artists be listed. The form also asked for a description of the style of music to be performed and the target audience. The original form asked for details of ethnic groups likely to attend the performance, but that version was revised to omit those parameters in December 2008.

In November 2017, the Met Police announced that, following a review of how the form was being used, it was to be scrapped.

== Opposition ==
Feargal Sharkey, Head of UK Music and former lead singer of The Undertones, gave evidence to the House of Commons Culture, Media and Sport Select Committee in November 2008 stating that "We learned that the Metropolitan Police, in conjunction with an organization called London Councils - a representative body for all London borough - at the end of last year jointly wrote to all 33 local London boroughs recommending that they insert some particular wording into their local licensing policy statements." He added that the London Borough of Hillingdon in western Greater London, "tries to make a direct connection not only between crime and disorder and live music, but most astonishingly - I'm still knocked over in disbelief - between live music and the prevention of terrorism." Sharkey stated that he would be seeking a Judicial Review on the use of the form and had complained to the Equality and Human Rights Commission about the targeting of musical styles favoured by black and Asian teenagers. According to Sharkey an afternoon school charity concert in a public park had been cancelled because organisers could not supply the details of the young performers.

Jon McClure, lead singer with Reverend and the Makers, set up a petition on the UK Prime Minister's website to allow protest against what he alleges as "racial discrimination".

In a statement on their web site, The British Academy of Composers and Songwriters CEO Patrick Rackow stated "...the imposition of Form 696 on live music is likely to discourage the existence and growth of live music. Music has long been a positive form of free expression, for people from all walks of life to create and enjoy. This form appears to single out certain genres of music and ethnic audiences and therefore the Academy cannot support it.”

In December 2008, Mike Howlett, Chairman of the Music Producers Guild (UK), wrote to the General Secretary of the Musicians Union "In keeping with the Musicians Union and UK Music, we feel this is a gross infringement of civil liberties and a form of racial discrimination. We also feel that this will deter the staging of live musical events, stifle free expression and possibly penalise certain genres of music and ethnic audiences. Our members are horrified that this legislation, introduced in 2006, is being enforced under the guise of public law and order. We see no reason why artists and/or venue owners and managers should be forced to comply."

== Police position ==
David Isles, Detective Superintendent of the Metropolitan Police Clubs and Vice unit has stated that Form 696 is not designed to stop people having a good time. The Metropolitan Police web site describes the form as a Promotion Event risk assessment form.

Detective Chief Superintendent Richard Martin stated that the original form, with its questions relating to audience ethnicity, "was removed just because I don't think it added any value to the form.... We take account of where the event is playing, what other events might be playing nearby, the type of music that's being played, and whether there have been problems before. We've had quite a few of what I consider 'higher risk events', where there may be some problems - so we recommend additional searching processes and additional security to help manage the event safely." "It's not about being risk averse, it's about managing the risk," he said. "If you're a publican and you are just having some performers to entertain your regular customers, you won't be expected to do a risk assessment. It's for when the performance is being put on to draw people in. We will never assess somebody just on the genre of music they are performing. There is a whole raft of factors that are taken into account."

== Form revised ==
In September 2009, the Metropolitan Police announced "that venues would no longer be asked for details of the music style. A requirement to provide the telephone number of the performing artist will also be dropped and an independent "scrutiny panel" will be set up to ensure that the form is not misused." Feargal Sharkey described this as an "exercise in semantics" and called for the form to be completely scrapped. He added that "it was clear that the altered version continued to target musicians from ethnic minorities and he objected strongly to a question which asks about the 'make-up of the patrons'."

== Form 696 scrapped ==
On 10 November 2017, it was announced that the use of Form 696 was to be discontinued in Greater London following a review called for by Mayor of London Sadiq Khan. Reporting the decision, the BBC noted, "The Met denied the form had been used to target particular genres but said it had decided to drop it after a fall in 'serious incidents' at music events"; however, the BBC also reported that a Freedom of Information request earlier in 2017 had discovered that 16 other English police forces were using forms similar to Form 696.
