= Someone to Somebody =

Single by Feargal Sharkey

from the album Feargal Sharkey
- B-side: "Coldwater"
- Released: 24 March 1986
- Genre: Pop, pop rock
- Length: 4:10
- Label: Virgin Records
- Songwriters: Geraldine L. Gooden, Michael Torrence, Thomas Gordy, Daniel Kane
- Producer: David A. Stewart

Feargal Sharkey singles chronology
"You Little Thief" (1985)	"Someone to Somebody" (1986)	"It's All Over Now" (1986)

"Someone to Somebody" is a song by Irish singer Feargal Sharkey, released on 24 March 1986 as the third single from his self-titled debut album (1985). It was written by Geraldine L. Gooden, Michael Torrence, Thomas Gordy and Daniel Kane, and produced by David A. Stewart. The song reached No. 64 in the UK and No. 30 in Ireland.

A music video was filmed to promote the single. The B-side, "Coldwater", was exclusive to the single and is an instrumental written by Sharkey.

== Critical reception ==
Upon its release, William Shaw of Smash Hits commented, "Extraordinary really. Through anyone else's vocal cords, this song would remain a corny, overblown bit of nonsense, full to the brim with too many lead guitars and pompous string arrangements. But [Sharkey's] quavering tones have a strange power to change an average song into something out of the ordinary." Andy Hurt of Sounds noted, "Producer David A. Stewart has once again been allowed to undermine the opposition to Eurythmics by paying lip service to the '80s icon, the drum sound and piling the pop rubble on top. A sax solo, gushing strings, double-tracked flute and Sharkey gobbling along for good measure." Betty Page of Record Mirror stated, "Can one actually classify Fearg as A Bona Fide Pop Star? Dash it, why not. Can't say how long it'll last in the light of this yawn-a-second angst ridden epic, which is doubtless a solid track for the album, but hardly a single." Henry Everingham of The Sydney Morning Herald wrote: "As a soloist, one fears that Sharkey could easily sink into mush. 'Someone to Somebody' teeters on the edge of this. While the song has some tasteful flute and saxophone solos and terrific harmonies, the howling of 'I'm so alone' at the song's end is a bit too much to take."

== Formats ==
7" single
No.	Title	Written by	Length
1.	"Someone To Somebody"	Geraldine L. Gooden, Michael Torrence, Thomas Gordy, Daniel Kane	4:10
2.	"Coldwater"	Feargal Sharkey	3:24

12" single
No.	Title	Written by	Length
1.	"Someone To Somebody (Extended Version)"	Gooden, Torrence, Gordy, Kane	5:21
2.	"Coldwater"	Sharkey	4:02

== Personnel ==
- Feargal Sharkey - lead vocals, producer of "Coldwater"
- David A. Stewart - producer of "Someone to Somebody"

== Charts ==
Chart (1986)	Peak position
Australia (Kent Music Report)	64
Irish Singles Chart	30
UK Singles Chart	64
