= More Love (Feargal Sharkey song) =

Single by Feargal Sharkey

from the album Wish
- B-side: "A Breath of Scandal"
- Released: 11 January 1988
- Genre: Pop
- Length: 4:35
- Label: Virgin Records
- Songwriter: Benmont Tench
- Producer: Danny Kortchmar

Feargal Sharkey singles chronology
"It's All Over Now" (1986)	"More Love" (1988)	"Out of My System" (1988)

"More Love" is a song by Irish singer Feargal Sharkey, released on 11 January 1988 as the first single from his second studio album, Wish (1988). It was written by Benmont Tench and produced by Danny Kortchmar. The song reached No. 44 in the UK. A music video was filmed to promote the single. The B-side, "A Breath of Scandal" was exclusive to the single, and was written and produced by Sharkey. A piano version of "More Love" was included on the 12" and CD formats of the single.

"More Love" features guitar by Keith Richards, who was working on Chuck Berry's Hail! Hail! Rock 'n' Roll at the same studio. Sharkey told the Sunday Independent in 1988: "I quite literally just popped out to the toilet, and when I came back to the studio, Keith Richards was siting there! It was quite nerve-wracking for a bit - all of a sudden I had to work in front of one of my childhood heroes."

== Reception ==
Upon release, Music & Media wrote: "A Stones-like guitar intro leads into a good, although fairly average, driving pop/rock song that will put the Irishman back on the map." Tom Hibbert of Smash Hits commented: "Spingling guitars. Honking saxes. Lavish production. A dull song that begins and then ends before you've really noticed. [Sharkey] still has that "unusual" voice but the Canadian lovelettes, Ann and Nancy Wilson (of Heart), do this sort of thing so much better."

Lawrence Donegan of Record Mirror wrote: "Feargal Sharkey's comeback single and possibly the worst 45 you'll hear in 1988. Without the protection of his Undertones colleagues, Sharkey has been shown up for the uninteresting, unoriginal performer he is." Vincent O'Keeffe of The Kerryman commented: "For a man who worked with The Assembly and has [had] a number one with "A Good Heart", this release is not on boil at all and is a miss from start to finish. All the ingredients are there but the magic is missing.

== Formats ==
7" single
No.	Title	Written by	Length
1.	"More Love"	Benmont Tench	4:35
2.	"A Breath Of Scandal"	Feargal Sharkey	3:21

12" single
No.	Title	Written by	Length
1.	"More Love"	Tench	4:35
2.	"A Breath Of Scandal"	Sharkey	3:21
3.	"More Love (Piano Version)"	Tench	4:40

CD single
No.	Title	Written by	Length
1.	"More Love"	Tench	5:02
2.	"A Breath Of Scandal"	Sharkey	3:21
3.	"More Love (Piano Version)"	Tench	4:40
4.	"A Good Heart"	Maria McKee	4:41

== Personnel ==
- Feargal Sharkey - lead vocals, producer of "A Breath of Scandal" and "More Love (Piano Version)", mixing on "A Breath of Scandal"
- Keith Richards - guitar
- Danny Kortchmar - producer of "More Love"
- Shelly Yakus, Marc De Sisto - mixing on "More Love"
- Richard Haughton - photography
- The Design Clinic - sleeve

== Charts ==
Chart (1988)	Peak position
Australia (Kent Music Report)	61
Belgium (Ultratop 50 Flanders)	24
Netherlands (Single Top 100)	43
Netherlands (Tipparade)	6
UK Singles (OCC)	44
