= You Little Thief =

1985 single by Feargal Sharkey

Single by Feargal Sharkey

from the album Feargal Sharkey
- B-side: "The Living Actor"
- Released: 23 December 1985
- Length: 4:31
- Label: Virgin
- Songwriter: Benmont Tench
- Producer: David A. Stewart

Feargal Sharkey singles chronology
"A Good Heart" (1985)	"You Little Thief" (1985)	"Someone to Somebody" (1986)

"You Little Thief" is a song by Northern Irish singer Feargal Sharkey, released in December 1985 as the second single from his self-titled debut album. It was written by Benmont Tench and produced by David A. Stewart. The song reached No. 5 in the United Kingdom and was a hit in several other countries, including Australia, Belgium, and Ireland.

A music video was filmed to promote the single. The B-side, "The Living Actor", was exclusive to the single. It was written by Anthony Moore and Sharkey, and produced by Sharkey. The extended version of "You Little Thief" was created by Sharkey.

== Critical reception ==
On its release, Dave Henderson of Sounds was critical of the song, writing, "More hits for men with quiffs. Sure, it's crap, with a dreadful melody line and rhythm lifted from many a moon ago, but, what's new?" Armond White at Spin said "the line 'There's no feeling at all' is belted so powerfully that shtick replaces irony" and called it "oily drivel".

== Formats ==
7-inch single
No.	Title	Written by	Length
1.	"You Little Thief"	Benmont Tench	4:31
2.	"The Living Actor"	Anthony Moore, Feargal Sharkey	3:06

12-inch single
No.	Title	Written by	Length
1.	"You Little Thief" (extended version)	Tench	5:02
2.	"The Living Actor"	Moore, Sharkey	3:06

12-inch single (alternate release)
No.	Title	Written by	Length
1.	"You Little Thief" (extended version)	Tench	5:02
2.	"You Little Thief"	Tench	4:31
3.	"The Living Actor"	Moore, Sharkey	3:06

12-inch single (special remix)
No.	Title	Written by	Length
1.	"You Little Thief" (extended version)	Tench	6:13
2.	"You Little Thief" (7-inch version)	Tench	4:31
3.	"The Living Actor"	Moore, Sharkey	3:06

CD single
No.	Title	Written by	Length
1.	"You Little Thief" (12-inch version)	Tench	5:02
2.	"Listen to Your Father" (12-inch version)	Carl Smyth	5:02
3.	"More Love"	Tench	4:24

== Personnel ==
- Feargal Sharkey – lead vocals, producer of "The Living Actor", arranger
- David A. Stewart – producer and arranger on "You Little Thief", arranger on "The Living Actor"
- Shelly Yakus – mixing on "You Little Thief"
- David Rose – guitar on "The Living Actor"

== Charts ==
=== Weekly charts ===
Chart (1986)	Peak position
Australia (Kent Music Report)	4
Belgium (Ultratop 50 Flanders)	9
Europe (European Hot 100 Singles)	18
Ireland (IRMA)	3
Netherlands (Dutch Top 40)	13
Netherlands (Single Top 100)	10
New Zealand (Recorded Music NZ)	38
Switzerland (Schweizer Hitparade)	27
UK Singles (Official Charts)	5
West Germany (GfK)	30

=== Year-end charts ===
Chart (1986)	Position
Australia (Kent Music Report)	41
