= Mystery Lady: Songs of Billie Holiday =

1994 studio album by Etta James

Studio album by Etta James
- Released: March 15, 1994
- Label: RCA Victor
- Producer: John Snyder

Etta James chronology
| The Right Time (1992) | Mystery Lady: Songs of Billie Holiday (1994) | Time After Time (1995) |

Professional ratings
Review scores
| Source | Rating |
|---|---|
| AllMusic | 3/5 stars |
| Robert Christgau | A− |
| Entertainment Weekly | B+ |

Mystery Lady: Songs of Billie Holiday is the eighteenth studio album by Etta James, released in 1994. The album reached a peak position of number two on Billboard's Top Jazz Albums chart and won the 1995 Grammy Award for Best Jazz Vocal Album.

== Track listing ==
All the songs on this album are covers of songs originally performed by or covered by Billie Holiday during her lifetime.

| No. | Title | Writer(s) | Length |
|---|---|---|---|
| 1. | "Don't Explain" | Arthur Herzog, Jr., Billie Holiday | 5:15 |
| 2. | "You've Changed" | Bill Carey, Carl Fischer | 4:35 |
| 3. | "The Man I Love" | George Gershwin, Ira Gershwin | 4:26 |
| 4. | "I Don't Stand a Ghost of a Chance (With You)" | Victor Young, Ned Washington, Bing Crosby | 4:16 |
| 5. | "Lover Man (Oh, Where Can You Be?)" | Jimmy Davis, Jimmy Sherman, Roger Ramirez | 5:24 |
| 6. | "Embraceable You" | George Gershwin, Ira Gershwin | 3:55 |
| 7. | "How Deep Is the Ocean" | Irving Berlin | 4:18 |
| 8. | "(I'm Afraid) The Masquerade Is Over" | Herb Magidson, Allie Wrubel | 5:45 |
| 9. | "Body and Soul" | Johnny Green, Edward Heyman, Robert Sour, Frank Eyton | 4:16 |
| 10. | "The Very Thought of You" | Ray Noble | 4:30 |
| 11. | "I'll Be Seeing You" | Irving Kahal, Sammy Fain | 4:43 |
