= Time After Time (Etta James album) =

Studio album by Etta James
- Released: May 9, 1995
- Label: RCA Victor
- Producer: John Snyder

Etta James chronology
Mystery Lady: Songs of Billie Holiday (1994)	Time After Time (1995)	Love's Been Rough on Me (1997)

Time After Time is the nineteenth studio album by Etta James, released in 1995. The album reached a peak position of number five on Billboard's Top Jazz Albums chart.

== Reception ==
Professional ratings
Review scores
Source	Rating
AllMusic	3.5/5 stars
The New Rolling Stone Album Guide	4.5/5 stars

In a review for AllMusic, Steve Leggett wrote: "James elegantly delivers her versions of vocal jazz standards... It's all graceful and uptown, and James' singing is hauntingly beautiful."

Allen Howie of Louisville Music News stated: "What's clear is that James has lived with these songs... James brings an earthy elegance to the dozen tunes appearing here. With impeccable arrangements by Walton and a delightfully diverse song selection, Time After Time leaves James' stamp on jazz while proving yet again that her muse is as eclectic as it is enduring."

== Track listing ==
No.	Title	Writer(s)	Length
1.	"Don't Go to Strangers"	Redd Evans, Arthur Kent, Dave Mann	5:00
2.	"Teach Me Tonight"	Sammy Cahn, Gene De Paul	4:59
3.	"Love Is Here To Stay"	George Gershwin, Ira Gershwin	4:29
4.	"The Nearness Of You"	Hoagy Carmichael, Ned Washington	6:32
5.	"Time After Time"	Sammy Cahn, Jule Styne	4:23
6.	"My Funny Valentine"	Lorenz Hart, Richard Rodgers	5:46
7.	"Imagination"	Johnny Burke, James Van Heusen	6:52
8.	"Fool That I Am"	Floyd Hunt	3:58
9.	"Willow Weep for Me"	Ann Ronell	6:23
10.	"Ev'rybody's Somebody's Fool"	Howard Greenfield, Jack Keller	5:15
11.	"Night and Day"	Cole Porter	4:16
12.	"Someone To Watch Over Me"	George Gershwin, Ira Gershwin	6:01
