= Amwell Magna Fishery =

Fishery in Hertfordshire, England

Coordinates: 51.796°N 0.000°E

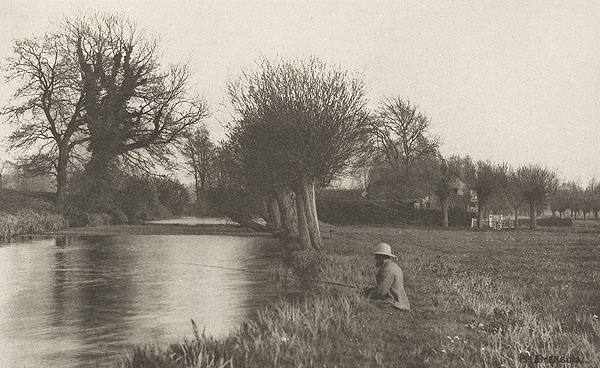
Amwell Magna Fishery in 1888.

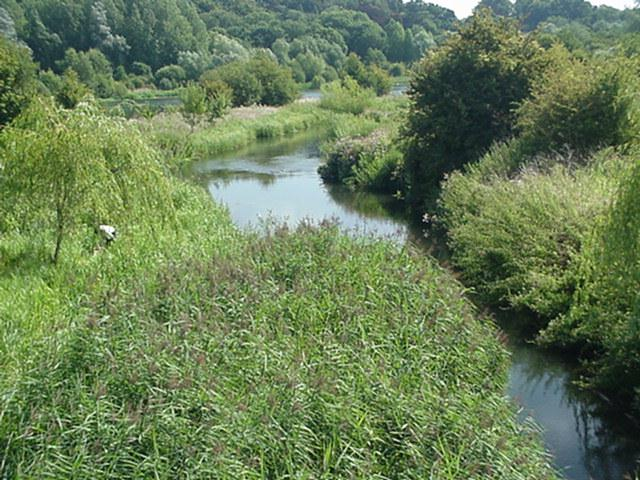
The River Lea at Amwell Magna.

Amwell Magna Fishery is located on the River Lea at Great Amwell which is 1.5 miles (2.4 km) south of Ware in Hertfordshire, southern England.

== History ==
The fishery was established in 1831 and is the oldest fly fishing club in the United Kingdom still fishing the same water. The river was fished by Izaak Walton author of The Compleat Angler in the 17th century. The fishery has faced many problems over the years including gravel extraction, flood alleviation schemes and a major pollution in 1965.

== Present day ==
The fishery is one of the closest rivers to Central London where wild trout can be caught and was featured in the BBC series Rivers which was broadcast in 2009.
