= Listen to Your Father =

Single by Feargal Sharkey
- B-side: "Can I Say I Love You"
- Released: 1 October 1984
- Genre: Pop
- Length: 3:14
- Label: Virgin; Zarjazz
- Songwriter: Carl Smyth
- Producers: Feargal Sharkey; Liquidator Productions

Feargal Sharkey singles chronology
"Listen to Your Father" (1984)	"Loving You" (1984)

"Listen to Your Father" is a song by the Northern Irish singer Feargal Sharkey, released as his standalone debut single on 1 October 1984. It was written by Carl Smyth, and produced by Sharkey and Liquidator Productions (i.e. the English ska and pop band Madness). The song reached No. 23 in the UK and No. 22 in Ireland. The B-side, "Can I Say I Love You", was written by Smyth and Sharkey.

The single was the first to be released on Zarjazz, a sub-label of Virgin Records which had been formed that year by Madness. All members of Madness performed on the record minus lead vocalist Suggs. When "Listen to Your Father" became a hit, Sharkey left the label to sign with Virgin as Madness had not required him to sign a contract with their label.

A music video was created to promote the song. Sharkey performed the song on popular UK music chart television programme Top of the Pops with members of Madness as backing musicians. Madness members Smyth and Mark Bedford also appeared with Sharkey on UK show Saturday Starship to promote the single and the Zarjazz label.

On 24 November 1985, the song was performed live at the Hammersmith Odeon, London, during Madness' tour to promote their Mad Not Mad album. Sharkey performed lead vocals, with Madness singer Suggs introducing Sharkey as "Mr Teenage Kicks", referring to the Sharkey's hit song with his ex-band the Undertones.

== Critical reception ==
Upon its release, Paul Bursche of Number One wrote, "It's not a brilliant song but its sheer stomping, foot-tapping brightness almost guarantees Fergy a hit." Paul Massey of the Aberdeen Evening Express stated, "I preferred him with the Undertones but this is still good - bold, brassy and powerful." Frank Edmonds of the Bury Free Press gave the song a 9 out of 10 rating and described it as "a bouncy, vibrant single full of brass and all the life and drive which made the Undertones great". He added that Sharkey and Madness made a "good combination" and that Sharkey is "the most wonderfully distinctive voice in pop".

Jim Reid of Record Mirror was less favourable, writing, "A Carl Smythe tune, 'Listen to Your Father' is the 4-4 stomp of early Madness without the winning melody and hook lines. Sharkey's voice isn't well served by the brassy jolting action. The Ulsterman deserves a more restrained treatment than this." Vici MacDonald of Smash Hits stated, "This man has gone one of the best voices around. What, then, is he doing on this foul pub-rock thingy? A terrible waste!"

== Formats ==
7" single
No.	Title	Written by	Length
1.	"Listen to Your Father"	Carl Smyth	3:14
2.	"Can I Say I Love You"	Smyth, Feargal Sharkey	3:30

12" single
No.	Title	Written by	Length
1.	"Listen to Your Father" (Extended Version)	Smyth	5:00
2.	"Can I Say I Love You"	Smyth, Sharkey	3:52

== Personnel ==
- Jill Furmanovsky - photography
- Feargal Sharkey, Liquidator Productions - producer
- Michael Brauer - extended remix of "Listen to Your Father"

== Charts ==
Chart (1984)	Peak position
Netherlands (Tipparade)	15
Ireland (IRMA)	22
UK Singles (Official Charts)	23
