= Loving You (Feargal Sharkey song) =

Single by Feargal Sharkey
- B-side: "Is This an Explanation?"
- Released: 17 June 1985
- Genre: Pop
- Length: 4:10
- Label: Virgin Records
- Songwriters: Feargal Sharkey, Jo Callis
- Producers: Roger Taylor, David Richards

Feargal Sharkey singles chronology
"Listen to Your Father" (1984)	"Loving You" (1985)	"A Good Heart" (1985)

"Loving You" is a song by Irish singer Feargal Sharkey, which was released in 1985 as a non-album single. It was written by Sharkey and Jo Callis, and produced by Queen drummer Roger Taylor and David Richards. "Loving You" reached No. 26 in the UK Singles Chart and remained in the chart for eleven weeks.

Taylor provided additional drums and synths on "Loving You". The single's B-side, "Is This An Explanation?", was exclusive to the single. It was written by Sharkey and Callis, and produced by Sharkey.

== Background ==
On the inspiration behind the song, Sharkey revealed in 1985, "I thought I'd write a song about the first time I made love to someone - putting it across in a song is very difficult."

== Music video ==
The song's music video was shot in an aircraft hangar which belonged to Billy Smart Jr. A 35 feet tall polystyrene statue was built for the video. Sharkey told Record Mirror in 1985, "The idea for the video was initially mine then it was expanded upon by Godley & Creme. The bloke who built the statue did the masks in Star Wars. Unfortunately the hangar wasn't quite big enough for us to get some of the shots from above that we wanted."

== Critical reception ==
On its release, Mike Gardner of Record Mirror wrote, "On the surface this sounds like the overwrought idiot offspring of 'Chariots of Fire' and 'Amazing Grace' - it's got more synthesisers than the entire back catalogue of Human League and Depeche Mode put together - and it takes ages to get going. But for all that, it has a strangely endearing quality to it."

== Formats ==
7" single
No.	Title	Written by	Length
1.	"Loving You"	Feargal Sharkey and Jo Callis	4:10
2.	"Is This An Explanation?"	Feargal Sharkey and Jo Callis	3:27

12" single
No.	Title	Written by	Length
1.	"Loving You"	Feargal Sharkey and Jo Callis	5:34
2.	"Is This An Explanation?"	Feargal Sharkey and Jo Callis	3:27

== Chart performance ==
Chart (1985)	Peak position
Australia (Kent Music Report)	97
Swiss Singles Chart	23
UK Singles Chart	26

== Personnel ==
- Feargal Sharkey - vocals, producer of "Is This An Explanation?"
- Roger Taylor - producer of "Loving You", additional drums and synths on "Loving You"
- Dave Richards - producer of "Loving You"
- Caryn Gough - sleeve design
- Richard Haughton - photography
