= Life, Love & the Blues =

Studio album by Etta James
- Released: June 30, 1998
- Studios: Fort Athens Studios, Riverside, California; Conway Studios, Hollywood
- Genres: Blues, funk, soul, jazz
- Label: Private Music
- Producer: Etta James

Etta James chronology
Love's Been Rough on Me (1997)	Life, Love & the Blues (1998)	12 Songs of Christmas (1998)

Professional ratings
Review scores
Source	Rating
The Penguin Guide to Blues Recordings	3/4 stars

Life, Love & the Blues is the twenty-first studio album by Etta James, released in 1998. The album reached a peak position of number three on Billboard's Top Blues Albums chart.

== Track listing ==
No.	Title	Length
1.	"Born Under a Bad Sign"	3:28
2.	"I Want To Ta Ta You, Baby"	5:56
3.	"Here I Am (Come and Take Me)"	4:55
4.	"Running Out of Lies"	5:03
5.	"Inner City Blues (Make Me Wanna Holler)"	7:01
6.	"Spoonful"	4:09
7.	"Life, Love & The Blues"	5:17
8.	"Hoochie Coochie Gal"	4:24
9.	"Cheating in the Next Room"	4:57
10.	"If You Want Me to Stay"	5:21
11.	"The Love You Save May Be Your Own"	4:01
12.	"I'll Take Care of You"	4:58

== Personnel ==
- Etta James - vocals
- Leo Nocentelli, Bobby Murray - guitar
- Josh Sklair - guitar, dobro
- David K. Mathews - keyboards
- Mike Finnigan - Hammond B-3 organ
- Sametto James - bass
- Donto Mento James - drums, percussion
- Jimmy Z - saxophone, harmonica
- Lee Thornburg - trumpet, valve trombone
- Tom Poole - trumpet
