= Songs from the Mardi Gras =

Studio album by Feargal Sharkey
- Released: 8 April 1991
- Studio: Digital Recorders (Nashville, Tennessee)
- Genre: Pop
- Label: Virgin
- Producer: Barry Beckett

Feargal Sharkey chronology
| Wish (1988) | Songs from the Mardi Gras (1991) |

Songs from the Mardi Gras is the third and last solo album of former Undertones singer Feargal Sharkey and was released in 8 April 1991 on Virgin Records. Despite the somewhat non-commercial character of the music, the single "I've Got News for You" did make it into the UK Top 20.

Speaking of the album and decision to finish his solo career afterwards, Sharkey told The Telegraph in 2013: "It's gonna sound quite kind of pathetic in many ways, but it was what I was feeling at the time; the last album I made emotionally I put a colossal amount into it, and I just felt I could not go on making that kind of intellectual and emotional investment anymore."

== Critical reception ==
Professional ratings
Review scores
| Source | Rating |
|---|---|
| Select | 2/5 stars |
| Smash Hits | 5/10 stars |
| Q | 2/5 stars |

Upon release, Adam Sweeting of The Guardian wrote: "Despite the nostril-assailing whiff of career-calculation, Songs from the Mardi Gras is at least a good deal better than its predecessor, the deplorable Wish." Hi-Fi News & Record Review considered the album to "prove that the days of The Undertones are wiped from [Sharkey's] memory and he is definitely a man of the world - money-minded, star-struck and shallow." They concluded: "Songs from the Mardi Gras is about as intelligent a title as the lyrics on this album deserve." Barry McIlheney of Q described it as "determinedly grown-up and quite frantic in its attempt to be easy listening".

== Track listing ==
| No. | Title | Writer(s) | Length |
|---|---|---|---|
| 1. | "After the Mardi Gras" | Feargal Sharkey, Greg Barnhill | 4:47 |
| 2. | "One Night in Hollywood" | Sharkey, Dennis Morgan | 5:32 |
| 3. | "Miss You Fever" | Sharkey, Morgan | 4:12 |
| 4. | "Women and I" | Sharkey, Mick Kitson | 4:44 |
| 5. | "Love Like Blood" | John Hiatt | 4:18 |
| 6. | "I've Got News for You" | Sharkey, Morgan | 4:52 |
| 7. | "To Miss Someone" | Maria McKee | 3:41 |
| 8. | "Sister Rosa" | Sharkey, Phil Ramacon | 4:09 |
| 9. | "I'll Take It Back" | Sharkey, Bob DiPiero, John Scott Sherrill | 4:15 |
| 10. | "Cry Like a Rainy Day" | Barnhill, Kenny Greenberg | 5:40 |
| 11. | "She Moved Through the Fair" | Traditional; arranged by Sharkey | 3:09 |

== Personnel ==
- Feargal Sharkey – vocals
- Dann Huff, Dennis Morgan, Kenny Greenberg, Kevin Armstrong, Reggie Young – guitar
- Don Potter – acoustic guitar
- Michael Rhodes – bass
- Barry Beckett, Mike Lawler – keyboards
- Eddie Bayers – drums
- Charles Rose, Jim Horn, Mike Haynes, Quitman Dennis – horns
- Beverley Skeete, Bob DiPiero, Greg Barnhill, Janice Hoyte, John Scott Sherrill, Johnny Cobb, Jonell Mosser, Kathy Burdick, Lisa Silver, Vicki Hampton – background vocals

Technical

- Alan Beukers – front cover photography

== Charts ==
| Chart (1991) | Peak position |
|---|---|
| Swedish Albums Chart | 41 |
| UK Albums Chart | 27 |
