= The Assembly =

British synth-pop project

- Origin: Basildon, Essex, England
- Genres: Synth-pop
- Years active: c. 1983
- Labels: Mute; Sire
- Past members: Vince Clarke; Eric Radcliffe

The Assembly were a British synth-pop project formed in 1983 in Basildon, England, by Vince Clarke (songwriting, keyboards, backing vocals) and Eric Radcliffe (songwriting, production).

Feargal Sharkey was hired as a guest vocalist for the A-side of the duo's only single, "Never Never". Clarke and Radcliffe had planned to use a different singer on each track the duo recorded, but the duo disbanded after the release of "Never Never".

== Band history ==
Clarke founded the Assembly shortly after disbanding Yazoo (featuring vocalist Alison Moyet), upon completion and distribution of Yazoo's 1983 album, You and Me Both.

The Assembly marked the most involved phase of Clarke's long-term professional relationship with sound engineer Radcliffe, who had contributed significant influences to the recordings of Clarke's previous bands, Depeche Mode and Yazoo. However, the Assembly project never became a full-fledged band and resulted in only one single release, the UK hit "Never Never". It featured a sampled guitar track triggered note for note on a Fairlight CMI. The sound was augmented by session musician Clem Clempson on electric guitar.

Former Undertones frontman Feargal Sharkey was hired to sing on this track. Clarke and Radcliffe had planned to use a different singer on each track the group recorded, but none were released after "Never Never".

The other track on the single, "Stop/Start", was an instrumental, featuring Clarke's signature songwriting style with syncopation that gradually became the downbeat of the musical phrase.

Despite the commercial success of the single, the Assembly was no longer a functioning entity by the end of 1984. Clarke went on to form Erasure with vocalist and co-songwriter Andy Bell in 1985. Although Erasure worked with Radcliffe on some of their early work, they eventually began working with other producers and engineers, including Flood. Sharkey, for his part, began a successful solo career in 1984, and achieved his only UK number one single in 1985 with "A Good Heart".

"Never Never" was re-released on CD single in 1996 with four tracks, containing both the normal and extended versions of both the title song, and "Stop/Start". The music video for "Never Never", filmed at Upminster Windmill in the London Borough of Havering, was featured on the first Now That's What I Call Music! video in 1983, though it did not feature on the corresponding compilation album.

== Reunion ==
In May 2011, Sharkey appeared on stage during the Erasure set at Mute Records' Short Circuit music festival for a one-off performance of "Never, Never" with Clarke.

== Discography ==
- "Never Never" – b/w "Stop/Start" (instrumental) – 1983 – Mute TINY1 – No. 4 UK – BPI: Silver

== See also ==
- The Tube (1982 TV series)
- Casio VL-1
