= Never Never (The Assembly song) =

Single by The Assembly
- B-side: "Stop/Start"
- Released: 31 October 1983
- Genre: New wave,synth-pop
- Length: 3:45
- Label: Mute
- Songwriter: Vince Clarke
- Producer: The Assembly

"Never Never" is the title of the only single released by the Vince Clarke project, the Assembly, in 1983.

The song features Feargal Sharkey of the Undertones on vocals; Sharkey's performance on "Never Never" was a total departure from the punk sound of the Undertones. The song peaked at number four on the UK Singles Chart and stayed on the chart for ten weeks. The music video for "Never Never" was featured on the video version of Now 1 but the song itself did not appear on the album version.

== Track listings ==
7" single

Side A
No.	Title	Writer(s)	Length
1.	"Never Never"	Vince Clarke	3:46

Side B
No.	Title	Writer(s)	Length
1.	"Stop/Start"	Vince Clarke, Eric Radcliffe	3:01

12" single

Side A
No.	Title	Length
1.	"Never Never" (extended version)	5:53

Side B
No.	Title	Length
1.	"Stop/Start" (extended version)	4:22

== Charts ==
Chart performance for "Never Never"
Chart (1983–1984)	Peak position
Australia (Kent Music Report)	95
Belgium (BRT Top 30)	18
Canada Top Singles (RPM)	49
France (SNEP)	77
Ireland (IRMA)	6
Netherlands (Single Top 100)	42
New Zealand (Recorded Music NZ)	40
Norway (VG-lista)	4
Sweden (Sverigetopplistan)	2
Switzerland (Schweizer Hitparade)	5
UK Singles (OCC)	4
West Germany (GfK)	19
Zimbabwe (ZIMA)	6
