= 12 Songs of Christmas (Etta James album) =

1998 studio album by Etta James

Studio album by Etta James
- Released: October 13, 1998
- Recorded: May 7 – June 19, 1998
- Genres: Blues, Christmas
- Length: 62:41
- Label: Private Music
- Producer: John Snyder

Etta James chronology
Life, Love & the Blues (1998)	12 Songs of Christmas (1998)	Heart of a Woman (1999)

12 Songs of Christmas is the twenty-second studio album and the first Christmas album by American blues singer Etta James. Private Music released the album in October 1998. Produced by John Snyder, the album includes standards arranged mostly by pianist Cedar Walton and solos by Walton, George Bohanon on trombone, and Red Holloway on tenor saxophone. Critical reception of the album was positive overall. Following its release, 12 Songs reached a peak position of number five on Billboard's Top Blues Albums chart.

== Composition ==
12 Songs of Christmas consists of twelve standard holiday songs with arrangements mostly by pianist Cedar Walton and solos by Walton, George Bohanon on trombone and Red Holloway on tenor saxophone. 12 Songs was recorded during May and June 1998 and produced by John Snyder with Lupe DeLeon serving as executive producer.

The album opens with "Winter Wonderland", originally by Felix Bernard and Richard B. Smith, followed by James Pierpont's "Jingle Bells". A "bluesy" rendition of Lou Baxter and Johnny Moore's "Merry Christmas, Baby" trails "This Time of Year" (Hollis, Owens). Other holiday standards appearing on the album include: "Have Yourself a Merry Little Christmas" (Ralph Blane, Hugh Martin), John Frederick Coots and Haven Gillespie's "Santa Claus Is Coming to Town", and "White Christmas", originally by Irving Berlin. "The Christmas Song (Chestnuts Roasting on an Open Fire)", originally by Mel Tormé and Robert Wells, "The Little Drummer Boy (Carol of the Drum)" (Katherine Kennicott Davis, Henry Onorati, Harry Simeone), Franz Xaver Gruber and Joseph Mohr's "Silent Night", and "Joy to the World" (George Frideric Handel, Lowell Mason, Isaac Watts) follow. The album closes with a rendition of Adolphe Adam and John Sullivan Dwight's "O Holy Night".

== Reception ==
Professional ratings
Review scores
Source	Rating
The Cincinnati Enquirer	2/4 stars
Daily News	2.5/4 stars
Entertainment Weekly	A
The New York Times	positive
Rolling Stone	3.5/5 stars

Critical reception of the album was positive overall. Jon Pareles of The New York Times wrote a positive review of the album, claiming that James turned standards into "suave after-hours jazz arrangements" that seemed "cozy and intimate". He wrote that James was "surprisingly reverent" and sounded "downright devout" on "Joy to the World". Entertainment Weekly's Matt Diehl felt that James' performances brought both "sass and class" and "ooze[d] passionately with old-school soul". David Hinckley of New York City's Daily News awarded 12 Songs "two-and-a-half bells" out of four. Rolling Stone called 12 Songs a "tour de force of interpretive rethinking" with "scintillating, bluesy spins on Yuletide evergreens". The Spartanburg Herald-Journal's Dan DeLuca also complimented the set.

The album received some negative criticism. Larry Nager of The Cincinnati Enquirer awarded the album two out of four stars and wrote that James had the ability to make "the ultimate blue Christmas disc" but failed to do so. Nager complimented "Merry Christmas, Baby" but considered the performance to be a "rare bit of juke joint" among "supper club sounds" that left him "wanting more".

== Track listing ==
1. "Winter Wonderland" (Felix Bernard, Richard B. Smith) – 4:26
2. "Jingle Bells" (James Pierpont) – 5:26
3. "This Time of Year" (Jesse Hollis, Cliff Owens) – 5:47
4. "Merry Christmas, Baby" (Lou Baxter, Johnny Moore) – 6:10
5. "Have Yourself a Merry Little Christmas" (Ralph Blane, Hugh Martin) – 4:45
6. "Santa Claus Is Coming to Town" (John Frederick Coots, Haven Gillespie) – 6:22
7. "White Christmas" (Irving Berlin) – 5:52
8. "The Christmas Song (Chestnuts Roasting on an Open Fire)" (Mel Tormé, Robert Wells) – 4:23
9. "The Little Drummer Boy (Carol of the Drum)" (Katherine Kennicott Davis, Henry Onorati, Harry Simeone) – 4:59
10. "Silent Night" (Franz Xaver Gruber, Joseph Mohr, traditional) – 4:49
11. "Joy to the World" (George Frideric Handel, Lowell Mason, traditional, Isaac Watts) – 5:30
12. "O Holy Night" (Adolphe Adam, John Sullivan Dwight) – 4:50

== Personnel ==
- Robi Banerji – assistant engineer
- George Bohanon – trombone
- Ronnie Buttacavoli – flugelhorn, trumpet
- Rudy Calvo – make-up
- John Clayton – bass
- Lupe DeLeon – executive producer
- Michael O. Drexler – digital editing, engineer
- Billy Higgins – drums
- Red Holloway – alto saxophone, tenor saxophone
- Etta James – arranger, vocals
- Sametto James – electric bass
- Sonny Mediana – art direction, photography
- Johnny Moore – composer
- John Nelson – assistant engineer
- Jay Newland – engineer
- Josh Sklair – arranger, guitar
- John Snyder – producer
- Cedar Walton – arranger, piano

Credits adapted from Allmusic.

== Charts ==
Following its release, 12 Songs of Christmas reached a peak position of number five on Billboard's Top Blues Albums chart. In 1999, James had five albums chart in the United States: Life, Love & the Blues, 12 Songs of Christmas, Heart of a Woman (1999), as well as two compilation albums Best of Etta James and Her Best (1997).

Chart (1998)	Peak position
US Top Blues Albums (Billboard)	5
