= Bobby Murray (musician) =

American songwriter (1953–2026)

- Born: June 9, 1953; Nagoya, Japan
- Died: April 30, 2026 (aged 72)
- Genres: Electric blues
- Occupations: Guitarist; songwriter; record producer
- Instrument: Guitar
- Years active: 1970s–2026
- Labels: Viceroots Records; No Cover Productions; Motorcitykidz; Goobertino

Bobby Murray (June 9, 1953 – April 30, 2026) was an American electric blues guitarist, songwriter and record producer who played in Etta James' backing band for 23 years, performed on three Grammy Award winning recordings with James and B. B. King and released four solo albums. In 2011, the Detroit Blues Society granted Murray their Lifetime Achievement Award. Murray led his own band in Metro Detroit and won several Detroit Music Awards. His last solo recording, Love Letters From Detroit, was released in 2021 and was granted the Outstanding Blues Recording of the Year at the Detroit Music Awards.

His guitar playing was mainly influenced by Albert Collins and B. B. King. Murray latterly resided in White Lake, Michigan, United States.

== Life and career ==
Murray was born on a US Air Force base in Nagoya, Japan, to a Japanese mother and an Irish father. Growing up in a military family, he was later raised in Tacoma, Washington. Murray attended the same high school as Robert Cray and they engaged Albert Collins to play at the school's graduation party.

He started his musical career playing in blues clubs in the San Francisco Bay Area, having originally formed an ensemble that became Robert Cray and the Crayolas. Throughout the 1970s and 1980s, Murray supplied guitar backing for Frankie Lee, Sonny Rhodes, Mark Naftalin, and others. He performed frequently with Albert Collins, Charlie Musselwhite, Otis Rush, Jimmy Witherspoon and John Lee Hooker. In 1988, Murray joined Etta James' backing ensemble, the Roots Band, performing with James for over 20 years. He also played and/or recorded with Albert King, Johnny "Guitar" Watson, Taj Mahal, Percy Mayfield, Sugar Pie DeSanto and Lowell Fulson.

Murray appeared on B. B. King's Grammy Award-winning album, Blues Summit, reuniting with Robert Cray on the track, "Playing With My Friends". Murray also played guitar on James' Grammy winning recordings, Let's Roll and Blues to the Bone. Murray's definitive style was heard on the Etta James song, "Blues is My Business" in an episode of television drama series, The Sopranos.

He performed with James' Roots Band on other television programs such as The Tonight Show, Austin City Limits and Late Night with David Letterman. Murray also played at the 1992 Summer Olympics in Barcelona, Spain, the WOMAD Festival and the inaugural celebration for President Bill Clinton.

Murray's debut album, The Blues is Now (1996), featured Frankie Lee and Freddie Hughes on vocals. The AllMusic journalist, Thom Owens, commented about Murray's work on the recording, "he's a fine guitarist, as he proves here, turning out jazzy, classy solos that separate him from the rest of the crowd". In 1999, the follow-up album, Waiting for Mr. Goodfingers..., was issued by No Cover Productions. A live album, Live & Lowdown! was released in May 2006.

In 2011, Murray received a Lifetime Achievement Award from the Detroit Blues Society. Murray also received Detroit Music Awards in the Outstanding Instrumentalist (Blues) and Outstanding Blues Performer/Group categories.

Murray's final album was Love Letters From Detroit (2021) and the title track, "Love Letter", is a song written by Murray and his wife about Etta James and him playing with her.

Murray died on April 30, 2026, aged 72.

== Discography ==
=== Albums ===
Year	Title	Record label
1996	The Blues is Now	Viceroots Records
1999	Waiting for Mr. Goodfingers...	No Cover Productions
2006	Live & Lowdown!	No Cover Productions
2013	I'm Sticking With You	Motorcitykidz Productions
2021	Love Letters From Detroit	Goobertino Music

== See also ==
- List of electric blues musicians
