= A Good Heart =

1985 single by Feargal Sharkey

Single by Feargal Sharkey

from the album Feargal Sharkey
- B-side: "Anger Is Holy"; "Ghost Train Blues"
- Released: 30 September 1985
- Genre: Synth-pop
- Length: 4:39
- Label: Virgin
- Songwriter: Maria McKee
- Producer: David A. Stewart

Feargal Sharkey singles chronology
"Loving You" (1985)	"A Good Heart" (1985)	"You Little Thief" (1985)

Official audio
- "A Good Heart" on YouTube

"A Good Heart" is a song written by Maria McKee and recorded by the Northern Irish singer Feargal Sharkey, released as the first single from his eponymous debut studio album. It was released on 30 September 1985 by Virgin Records and became a number-one hit in the United Kingdom, Australia, Belgium, Ireland, and the Netherlands.

== Background ==
Written by then-Lone Justice frontwoman Maria McKee about her relationship with Tom Petty and the Heartbreakers keyboard player Benmont Tench and produced by the Eurythmics' Dave Stewart, this was former Undertones singer Feargal Sharkey's third solo single. The song was Sharkey's only number one single and stayed at the top of the UK Singles Chart for two weeks in November 1985. However, it fared less well in the US, peaking at No. 74 on the Billboard Hot 100.

Sharkey followed up the single with the Tench-written "You Little Thief". This song was allegedly about Tench's side of the relationship with McKee. However, Tench denies the song is about McKee.

Austin, Texas-based singer-songwriter/guitarist Kris McKay performed a version of the song, featured on the soundtrack for the 1989 Patrick Swayze movie Road House. In 2007, McKee released her own recording of the track on her album Late December.

== Critical reception ==
Armond White at Spin said, "A strong, distinct voice and musical savvy could make anyone a vinyl hero, but the skills of the Undertones' former lead singer are more grating than ingratiating. Sharkey's machine produces an insistent warble—his voice lacks shocks."

== Formats ==
7-inch single
No.	Title	Writer(s)	Length
1.	"A Good Heart"	Maria McKee	4:39
2.	"Anger Is Holy"	David A. Stewart; Feargal Sharkey; Tim Daly	2:20

12-inch single
No.	Title	Writer(s)	Length
1.	"A Good Heart"	McKee	4:39
2.	"Ghost Train Blues"	Stewart; Sharkey; Daly	3:08
3.	"Anger Is Holy"	Stewart; Sharkey; Daly	2:20

== Personnel ==
- Feargal Sharkey: lead vocals, synthesizers, sequencers
- Patrick Seymour: keyboards
- David A. Stewart: guitars, slide guitar solo (Note: While the reference cited mentions that Stewart played guitar throughout the Feargal Sharkey album and describes the slide guitar solo in "A Good Heart", it is unclear whether it was in fact Stewart or Richard Morcombe (the other guitarist credited on the album) who actually performed the solo.)
- Dean Garcia: bass guitar
- Olle Romo: drums
- Debra Byrd: backing vocals
- Freida Williams: backing vocals

== Charts ==
=== Weekly charts ===
Chart (1985–1986)	Peak position
Australia (Kent Music Report)	1
Austria (Ö3 Austria Top 40)	13
Belgium (Ultratop 50 Flanders)	1
Canada Top Singles (RPM)	4
Europe (European Hot 100 Singles)	5
Ireland (IRMA)	1
Italy (Musica e dischi)	18
Netherlands (Dutch Top 40)	1
Netherlands (Single Top 100)	2
New Zealand (Recorded Music NZ)	3
Norway (VG-lista)	6
Portugal (AFP)	2
South Africa (Springbok Radio)	3
Switzerland (Schweizer Hitparade)	3
UK Singles (Official Charts)	1
US Billboard Hot 100	74
West Germany (GfK)	4

=== Year-end charts ===
Chart (1985)	Position
UK Singles (OCC)	8

Chart (1986)	Position
Australia (Kent Music Report)	8
Belgium (Ultratop)	24
Canada Top Singles (RPM)	51
Netherlands (Dutch Top 40)	13
Netherlands (Single Top 100)	49
New Zealand (RIANZ)	9
South Africa (Springbok Radio)	15
West Germany (Media Control)	41

== Sales and certifications ==
Region	Certification	Certified units/sales
Canada (Music Canada)	Gold	50,000^{^}
Netherlands (NVPI)	Gold	75,000^{^}
New Zealand (RMNZ)	Gold	15,000^{‡}
United Kingdom (BPI)	Gold	500,000^{^}
^{^} Shipments figures based on certification alone.^{‡} Sales+streaming figures based on certification alone.

== Release history ==
Region	Date	Format(s)	Label(s)	Ref.
United Kingdom	30 September 1985	7-inch vinyl; 12-inch vinyl	Virgin	
United States	February 1986	7-inch vinyl; 12-inch vinyl	A&M	
