= Re:Generations =

Remix album by Nat King Cole
- Released: March 10, 2009
- Genres: Hip hop; jazz; Latin music; reggae; rock
- Length: 46:26
- Labels: EMI; Capitol Records
- Producers: Carole Cole (exec.); Michaelangelo L'Acqua (also exec.); CeeLo Green; will.i.am; Cut Chemist; Salaam Remi; The Roots; Soul Diggaz; Damian Marley; Stephen Marley; Bitter:Sweet; Brazilian Girls; Just Blaze; Amp Fiddler; TV on the Radio

Re:Generations is a remix album, consisting of songs by the American singer Nat King Cole, reimagined by contemporary artists. It was released on March 10, 2009, by EMI/Capitol. Executive produced by Cole's daughter Carole Cole and a music director Michaelangelo L'Acqua, the album brought together a diverse range of producers from various genres. Re:Generations received positive reviews from music critics, with some of them praising Nat King Cole's vocal performance that blended well with the modern production.

== Recording ==
Re:Generations was created by Carole Cole, Nat King Cole's daughter, who took the role of an executive producer. Her sons Sage and Harley came up with the idea for the album. After 2 years of discussing the idea, the work on the album started. Cole was joined by an associate producer Mark Van Wye and an executive producer Michaelangelo L'Acqua, who previously worked as a music director for Yves Saint Laurent and Gucci, and produced fashion shows for various brands. L'Acqua made a list of producers for the project, who each then received a list of songs to choose from. The producers were given a creative freedom, with the only request from Cole being to keep Nat King Cole's voice central to the track. According to her, the goal of the project was to "musically bridge the so-called generation gap and hopefully create mutual admiration and respect between young people and their parents and grandparents". She believed her father would have been excited about Re:Generations, as he "loved music of all kinds".

== Release ==
Re:Generations was released on March 10, 2009, by EMI/Capitol Records. To celebrate the release of the album labels held a release party at Crewest Gallery in Los Angeles, California, alongside a Nat King Cole-inspired art exhibition. Upon release Re:Generations charted in Billboard's Top Contemporary Jazz Albums, where it peaked at number three.

On May 19, two months after the release of Re:Generations, Carole Cole died of lung cancer.

== Critical reception ==
Professional ratings
Review scores
Source	Rating
AllMusic	3.5/5 stars
The Guardian	4/5 stars
HipHopDX	3/5 stars
PopMatters	7/10 marks
Robert Christgau	(2-star Honorable Mention)

Re:Generations received positive reviews from music critics. John Bush, writing for AllMusic, commended the album's "parade of talented names" who made Nat King Cole's standards "as fluid as water", noting that "crossover fusions" from Re:Generations "will become dated far sooner" than Cole's original recordings. Ben Thompson of The Guardian praised Re:Generations, calling the album "unfeasibly witty and entertaining". HipHopDX applauded the album's producers who kept Nat King Cole's vocals "the star of the track". Will Layman of PopMatters gave the album a positive review, calling Cole's performance a "guiding star" of the album that blends well with the music on it. Robert Christgau commended the album in his "Consumer Guide", praising Nat King Cole who "slips suavely into the beats of the day".

== Track listing ==
No.	Title	Writer(s)	Producer(s)	Length
1.	"Lush Life"	Billy Strayhorn	CeeLo Green	3:16
2.	"Straighten Up and Fly Right" (feat. Natalie Cole)	Irving Mills, Nat King Cole	will.i.am	2:16
3.	"Day In, Day Out"	Johnny Mercer, Rube Bloom	Cut Chemist	2:44
4.	"Brazilian Love Song" (feat. Bebel Gilberto)	Cole, Breno Ferreira, Al Hoffman, Dick Manning	Michaelangelo L'Acqua	4:48
5.	"The Game of Love" (feat. Nas)	Armando Peraza, Milt Raskin	Salaam Remi	2:27
6.	"Walkin' My Baby Back Home" (feat. The Roots)	Fred Ahlert, Roy Turk	The Roots	4:15
7.	"Hit That Jive, Jack" (feat. Izza Kizza)	Johnny Alston, Skeets Tolbert	Soul Diggaz; The Weirdos	3:42
8.	"Calypso Blues" (feat. Damian Marley & Stephen Marley)	Cole, Don George	Damian Marley; Stephen Marley	4:31
9.	"More and More of Your Amour"	George David Weiss, Joe Sherman	Bitter:Sweet	3:18
10.	"El Choclo"	Cole, Bill Schluger, Aaron Johnston, Didi Gutman, Sabina Sciubba	Brazilian Girls	4:55
11.	"Pick-Up"	Dorothy Wayne, Raymond Rasch	Just Blaze	3:54
12.	"Anytime Anyday Anywhere"	Lee Wiley, Ned Washington, Victor Young	Amp Fiddler	3:08
13.	"Nature Boy"	Eden Ahbez	TV on the Radio	3:12
Total length:				46:26

== Personnel ==
Credits are adapted from the album's liner notes and AllMusic.

Musical personnel

- Nat King Cole – vocals (1, lead on 2–13)
- Natalie Cole – vocals (2)
- Bebel Gilberto – vocals (4)
- Nas – rap vocals (5)
- Damian Marley – vocals (8)
- Stephen Marley – vocals (8)
- Tariq Trotter – rap vocals (6)
- Izza Kizza - lead vocals (7)
- Soul Diggaz - additional vocals (7)
- Bitter:Sweet - additional vocals (9)
- Sabina Sciubba – additional vocals (10)
- Mela Machinko – additional vocals (11)
- Stephanie McWhite – additional vocals (11)
- Stoni – additional vocals (11)
- James Poyser – keyboards (6)
- Ahmir Thompson – drums (6)
- Mike Feingold – guitar (6)
- Didi Gutman – additional keyboards (10)
- Cut Chemist – additional guitar, additional bass guitar, additional keyboards, additional scratching (3)
- David Andrew Sitek – drums, guitar, synthesizer (13)
- Amp Fiddler – drum programming, keyboards, additional vocals (12)
- Andrés Humberto Hernandez – bongos (12)
- Benedict Green – drum programming, percussion (4)
- Meg Okura – viola, violin
- Dave Eggar – cello
- David William Smith – trombone
- Jeff Pierce – trumpet
- Jeremy Williams – guitar, bass guitar
- John Roggie – Fender Rhodes

Technical personnel

- Carole Cole – executive producer, art direction
- Michaelangelo L'Acqua – executive producer
- Mark Van Wye – associate producer
- Joel Douek - string arrangements (4)
- Fabrice Dupont – recording engineer, mixing (4)
- Will.i.am – Natalie Cole's vocal engineer, mixing (2)
- Chris Moore – recording engineer, mixing (13)
- Jon Smeltz – recording engineer, mixing (6)
- Franklin Socorro – recording engineer, mixing (5)
- Soul Diggaz - recording engineer, mixing (7)
- Andrew Wright – recording engineer, additional mixing (11), photography
- Kyle Boyd – recording engineer, mixing assistant
- Samuel Jacquet – recording engineer (7)
- Steve Mandel – recording engineer (6)
- Dan Huron – recording engineer
- Padraic Kerin - additional recording engineer (2)
- Danna Rosenthal – recording engineer
- Chris Gehringer – mastering
- Juan Blas Caballero – mixing
- Dylan Dresdow – mixing (2)
- Collin Dupuis – mixing (12)
- James Poyser (of Randy Watson Experience) - mixing (6)
- Ahmir Thompson (of Randy Watson Experience) - mixing (6)
- Salaam Remi - mixing (5)
- David Andrew Sitek - mixing (13)
- Ryan West – mixing (11)
- Aaron Johnston – programming
- Susan Lavoie – art direction
- Tom Recchion – art direction
- Sage Zailm Cole – artwork, cover art
- Ritzy Periwinkle – artwork, design
- Man One – artwork, hand lettering, paintings
- Overton Lloyd – artwork
- Gustavo Alberto Garcia Vaca – artwork
- Chago Akii-Bua – photography
- Kwaku Alston – photography
- Scott Berkson – photography
- Danny Clinch – photography
- Joseph Cultice – photography
- Henrique Gendre – photography
- Edgar Hoill – photography
- Brian Jones – photography
- Michael Lavine – photography
- Vladimir Radojicic – photography
- Popsy Randolph – photography
- John Roe – photography
- Justin Smith – photography
- Chuck Stewart – photography
- Joshua Winstead – photography
- Escaped Crusader – poetry
- Jasmine Diaz – assistant
- Frank Collura – A&R
- Jane Ventom – A&R

== Charts ==
Chart (2009)	Peak position
US Top Contemporary Jazz Albums (Billboard)	3
