= Izza Kizza =

American hip-hop recording artist and MC (born 1981)

Izza Kizza (born Terry Davis; 1981) is an American hip-hop recording artist, rapper, and songwriter. He first gained recognition in the mid-2000s while working with the production team Soul Diggaz, releasing music under the alias Young Country (later stylized as Yung Kuntry). His early work included a single released through Universal Records and feature appearances on the Latin pop duo Sin Bandera’s album Mañana, which received a nomination at the Latin Grammy Awards. He later adopted the stage name Izza Kizza and signed with Timbaland's Mosley Music Group/Interscope Records imprint, releasing a series of mixtapes noted for their eclectic, high-energy style.

== Early life ==
Davis was born and raised in Valdosta, Georgia. He began performing at age twelve in a singing group with his older brother and two godbrothers. Inspired by early 1990s hip-hop acts such as Kris Kross, he gradually shifted toward rap and began developing his own performance identity.

== Career ==
=== 2004–2007: Soul Diggaz and the Young Country / Yung Kuntry era ===
In 2004, Davis was introduced to a member of the production team Soul Diggaz through a family connection. He relocated to New Jersey and joined their creative camp, where he began recording under the stage name Young Country, later stylized as Yung Kuntry.

While working with Soul Diggaz, Davis signed with Universal Records and, in 2006, released the 12" single *“Pattycake” / “I'm Official”*. The B-side “I'm Official” features vocals performed by songwriter and producer Shalom "J.Storm" Miller.

As Yung Kuntry, Davis also contributed rap features to two tracks—“Lo Que Llamas Amor” and “No No”—on the album Mañana by the Mexican-Argentine duo Sin Bandera. The album was later nominated for the Latin Grammy Award for Best Pop Album by a Duo or Group with Vocals, marking Davis’s first Grammy nomination credit.

In 2007, Davis contributed songwriting and vocal work to the track “30 Rocks” on Ridin’ High by 8Ball & MJG, writing the song’s chorus and providing vocals that were sampled, chopped, and screwed for the hook.

=== 2007–2010: Transition to Izza Kizza and Mosley Music Group ===
Following his early success within the Soul Diggaz camp, Davis adopted the stage name Izza Kizza and developed a more experimental, high-energy rap style.

During this period, Davis also worked closely with rapper and dancer Sharaya J, another longtime Missy Elliott protégé. His early creative support contributed to her artistic development prior to her national breakout on the Fox competition series The Four: Battle for Stardom, where she finished as runner-up in 2018.

His work with Soul Diggaz led to collaborations with Missy Elliott, including “Walk The Dawg,” which samples Shirley Ellis’ “ The Clapping Song”.

His growing reputation led to signing with Timbaland’s Mosley Music Group/Interscope Records imprint. During this period he released several mixtapes and was featured in music publications for his unconventional delivery and genre-blending production choices.

In 2008, Izza Kizza released Kizzaland, mixed by Nick Catchdubs. Tracks from the mixtape received notable placements: “Red Wine” appeared on Paste Magazine’s June 2008 sampler, while “Millionaire” was featured on the soundtrack for Madden NFL 09.

His song “They’re Everywhere” appeared on NBA 2K10 and was used in a hip-hop routine on Season 5 of So You Think You Can Dance.

=== 2011–present: Independent releases ===
After parting ways with Mosley Music Group, Izza Kizza continued releasing independent music, including the mixtapes The Wizard of Iz (2009) and 10:15 (2010). He has collaborated with numerous artists across hip-hop, pop, and electronic music, contributing guest verses to projects by Calvin Harris, Crookers, and others.

== Musical style ==
Izza Kizza is known for his rapid-fire delivery, unconventional vocal cadences, and playful, genre-blending approach to hip-hop. Critics have described his work as “eclectic” and “energetic,” drawing comparisons to the more experimental corners of mid-2000s rap music.

== Awards and nominations ==
=== Latin Grammy Awards ===
Davis received nomination credit as a featured artist (credited as Yung Kuntry) on two tracks from Sin Bandera’s album Mañana, which was nominated for Best Pop Album by a Duo or Group with Vocals.

Year	Nominee / work	Award	Result
2006	Mañana (as a featured artist: "Lo Que Llamas Amor", "No No")	Latin Grammy Award for Best Pop Album by a Duo or Group with Vocals	Nominated

== Discography ==
=== Mixtapes ===
- 2008: Kizzaland
- 2009: The Wizard of Iz
- 2010: 10:15

=== Selected guest appearances ===
- 2006: “Lo Que Llamas Amor” – Sin Bandera (rap feature)
- 2006: “No No” – Sin Bandera (rap feature)
- 2007: “Happy Birthday” – Missy Elliott
- 2008: “Murder” – Ashlee Simpson, Bittersweet World
- 2009: “Worst Day” – Calvin Harris, Ready for the Weekend
- 2009: “What Up Y’all” – Crookers, Tons of Friends
- 2011: “Fucked Up” – Ultraviolet Sound
- 2015: “Bruh” – Jordyn Jones

=== Songwriting credits ===
- 2007: “30 Rocks” – 8Ball & MJG, Ridin’ High (chorus written by Davis; vocals sampled, chopped, and screwed)
