= Sin Bandera (album) =

2001 debut album by Sin Bandera

Studio album by Sin Bandera
- Released: December 11, 2001
- Recorded: 2001
- Studio: El Cuarto De Máquinas; Manu Estudio; Musicorp (Mexico City, Mexico)
- Genre: Latin pop; latin ballad
- Length: 44:10
- Label: Sony Discos
- Producer: Áureo Baqueiro

Sin Bandera chronology
Sin Bandera (2001)	De Viaje (2003)

Singles from Sin Bandera
- 1. "Entra En Mi Vida" Released: November 19, 2001; 2. "Te Vi Venir" Released: March 11, 2002; 3. "Kilómetros" Released: June 17, 2002; 4. "Sirena" Released: October 7, 2002; 5. "Ves" Released: January 6, 2003

Sin Bandera (English: Without A Flag) is the debut studio album from Sin Bandera. This album was released by Sony Discos on December 11, 2001 (see 2001 in music). The album earned the band the Latin Grammy Award for Best Pop Album by a Duo or Group with Vocals in the 3rd Annual Latin Grammy Awards on Wednesday, September 18, 2002, and was nominated for a Grammy Award for Best Latin Pop Album in the 44th Annual Grammy Awards on Sunday, February 23, 2003.

== Track listing ==
All tracks are written by Leonel García and Noel Schajris, except where noted.

No.	Title	Writer(s)	Producer (es)	Length
1.	"Para Alcanzarte"	Leonel García; Noel Schajris	Áureo Baqueiro	4:29
2.	"Kilómetros"	Leonel García; Noel Schajris	Áureo Baqueiro	3:42
3.	"A Encontrarte (feat. Áureo Baqueiro)"	Áureo Baqueiro; Leonel García; Noel Schajris	Áureo Baqueiro	3:53
4.	"A Primera Vista"	Leonel García	Áureo Baqueiro	4:04
5.	"Entra En Mi Vida"	Leonel García; Noel Schajris	Áureo Baqueiro	4:09
6.	"Te Vi Venir"	Leonel García	Áureo Baqueiro	3:15
7.	"Sirena"	Áureo Baqueiro; Leonel García	Áureo Baqueiro	4:28
8.	"No Neguemos El Amor"	Camila Vial; Noel Schajris	Áureo Baqueiro	4:28
9.	"Si Me Besas"	Leonel García; Noel Schajris	Áureo Baqueiro	4:12
10.	"Ves"	Leonel García; Noel Schajris	Áureo Baqueiro	3:34

== Charts ==
Chart (2002–2003)	Peak position
US Top Latin Albums (Billboard)	12
US Latin Pop Albums (Billboard)	5
US Heatseekers Albums (Billboard)	31

== Sales and certifications ==
Region	Certification	Certified units/sales
Argentina (CAPIF)	Platinum	40,000^{^}
Mexico (AMPROFON)	Platinum	150,000^{^}
United States (RIAA)	2× Platinum (Latin)	200,000^{^}
^{^} Shipments figures based on certification alone.
