= Una Última Vez =

EP by Sin Bandera
- Released: February 5, 2016
- Recorded: 2015–2016
- Genre: Latin pop
- Length: 20:55
- Label: Sony Music
- Producer: Áureo Baqueiro

Sin Bandera chronology
Reanuedo (2009)	Una Última Vez (2016)

Una Última Vez (One Last Time) is the first extended play by the duo Sin Bandera, after being out of the recording studios and onstage for almost eight years.

== Background ==
In November 2015, Noel Schajris and Leonel García announced through a video on their official Facebook account their return as a duo to the stage as well as a world tour, named the One Last Time Tour, that started in February 2016. In that same month, they announced the release of an EP that would contain five songs.

A Deluxe Edition was also released, which included two unreleased songs, "Siento" and "La solution", five songs from the standard edition and four of them in acoustic versions on audio and DVD.

== Track listing ==
1. "Una última vez"
2. "En ésta no"
3. "Sobre mí"
4. "Y más te amo"
5. "Para siempre... tal vez"
6. "Siento"
7. "La solución"
8. "Sobre mí" (featuring Maluma)
9. "Para siempre... tal vez" (acoustic version)
10. "En ésta no" (acoustic version)
11. "Y más te amo" (acoustic version)
12. "Ves" (acoustic version)

== Charts ==
Chart (2016)	Peak position
US Top Latin Albums (Billboard)	1
US Latin Pop Albums (Billboard)	1

== Sales and certifications ==
Region	Certification	Certified units/sales
Mexico (AMPROFON)	Gold	30,000^{^}
^{^} Shipments figures based on certification alone.
