= Hasta Ahora =

Compilation album by Sin Bandera
- Released: December 4, 2007
- Recorded: 2002–2007
- Genre: Latin pop
- Length: 68:55
- Label: Sony BMG
- Producer: Áureo Baqueiro

Sin Bandera chronology
Pasado (2006)	Hasta Ahora (2007)	Reanuedo (2009)

Hasta Ahora ("Until Now") is the compilation album from Sin Bandera. It was released on December 4, 2007.

== Track listing ==
1. Entra En Mi Vida – 4:09
2. Que Lloro – 4:02
3. Pero No – 4:20
4. Te Vi Venir – 3:15
5. Sirena – 4:28
6. Que Me Alcance La Vida – 3:49
7. Mientes Tan Bien – 3:48
8. Tócame – 4:40
9. Kilómetros – 3:42
10. Ves – 3:34
11. Suelta Mi Mano – 4:00
12. Si Tú No Estás Aquí – 3:48
13. Amor Real – 4:05
14. Será – 3:35
15. Kilómetros (Demo)
16. Y Llegaste Tú (Demo)
17. Si Me Besas (Demo)
18. Para Alcanzarte (Demo)

== Charts ==
=== Weekly charts ===
Chart (2007–2008)	Peak position
US Top Latin Albums (Billboard)	18
US Latin Pop Albums (Billboard)	8

=== Year-end charts ===
Chart (2008)	Position
US Top Latin Albums (Billboard)	71

== Sales and certifications ==
Region	Certification	Certified units/sales
Mexico (AMPROFON)	Gold	50,000^{^}
^{^} Shipments figures based on certification alone.
