= B5 (album) =

Studio album by B5
- Released: July 19, 2005
- Length: 40:21
- Label: Worldwide; Atlantic; Bad Boy
- Producer: Kevin Wales; Harve Pierre; Tha Cornaboyz; Rodney Jerkins; Ryan Leslie; Sean Garrett; Wirlie Morrs; China Black; Damian Hayward; Vance Jenkins; Akin Tayo Adewole

B5 chronology
B5 (2005)	Don't Talk, Just Listen (2007)

B5 is the debut album by American R&B group B5. It was released on July 19, 2005, in the United States and has sold over 200,000 copies since its release. The album debuted and peaked at No. 19 on the Billboard 200, while peaking at No. 7 on the Billboard Top R&B/Hip-Hop Albums chart. The album spawned the single, "All I Do", a Jackson 5 cover, which peaked at No. 71 on the Hot R&B/Hip-Hop Songs chart.

== Critical reception ==
Professional ratings
Review scores
Source	Rating
AllMusic	3/5 stars

AllMusic editor Andy Kellman wrote that "the group debuts with an album that employs an extremely lengthy list of songwriters and producers (including Rodney Jerkins, Ryan Leslie, and Corna Boyz), and the material they're given isn't much different than what you'd expect from young adolescents who'd rather entertain than shock. It's evident that they're talented and sound good together, but it'll take another album or two before they're able to prove themselves as more than just another boy group. This album should have no problem winning them a preteen fan base, and the parents of those fans will be thankful for the lack of a parental advisory sticker."

== Track listing ==
B5 track listing
No.	Title	Writer(s)	Length
1.	"Let It Be"	Lennon–McCartney	0:58
2.	"U Got Me"	Dwyane Nesmith; Richard Butler; Pierre Medor	3:27
3.	"Dance for You"	Garrett Hamler; Ryan Leslie	3:57
4.	"So Pretty"	Rodney Jerkins; LaShawn Daniels	3:36
5.	"All I Do"	Brian Holland; Michael Lovesmith	3:45
6.	"Teacher's Pet"	Wirlie Morris; Chip Days; Devine Evans; Carmen Liana; April Love	4:23
7.	"Let Me Know"	Ebony Burks; Timothy Hom	3:33
8.	"Nothin 'Bout Me"	Hamler; Leslie	3:18
9.	"Heartbreak"	Keri Hilson; Hachidai Nakamura; Rokusuke Ei; Robert Spencer	3:09
10.	"Back in Your Arms"	Arthur Ross; Leon Ware; Alverrick Powell; Burks	3:13
11.	"No More Games"	Akintayo Adewole; Vance Jenkins; Damen Heyward	3:09
12.	"You Don't Know"	Willie Baker; Wanita Woodgett; Shanell Woodgett; Calvin Waters; Alvin Waters	3:47

=== Sample credits ===
"Back in Your Arms" contains samples from Michael Jackson's "I Wanna Be Where You Are"

== Charts ==
Chart (2005)	Peak position
US Billboard 200	19
US Top R&B/Hip-Hop Albums (Billboard)	7
