= Take You There (Donnie Klang song) =

Single by Donnie Klang featuring Diddy

from the album Just a Rolling Stone
- Released: March 23, 2008
- Length: 4:15
- Label: Bad Boy; Atlantic
- Songwriters: Corte Ellis; Lashaun Owens; Karriem Mack; Maurice Wade; Nigel Talley; Sean Combs; Klang; Leroy Watson
- Producers: Soul Diggaz; Mo Chedda (co.); Combs (co.)

Donnie Klang singles chronology
"Take You There" (2008)	"Falling 4U" (2011)

Diddy singles chronology
"Through the Pain (She Told Me)" (2007)	"Take You There" (2008)	"Imma Put It on Her" (2009)

"Take You There" is a song by American singer and Making the Band 4 alumnus Donnie Klang. It was the sole debut single to come off his debut album Just a Rolling Stone (2008). Klang co-wrote the song alongside mentor Diddy, who shares featuring credits with Klang, and production team the Soul Diggaz. The song was released as the album's lead single on March 23, 2008 on digital download. "Take You There" managed to chart at number 10 on the US Billboard Bubbling Under Hot 100 and number 83 on the Billboard Pop 100.

== Music video ==
Directed by Ray Kay, the video starts out with Diddy exiting a club and entering a black limousine containing Donnie and two women in front of them. Diddy and Donnie go on a nightly excursion by going to a liquor store where, along with getting liquor, they attract two other women in the store and they come along with them. The limo stops at a condo where both men get entangled with the various women surrounding them. The video made its premiere on August 8, 2008 on FNMTV.

== Charts ==
Chart (2008)	Peak position
US Bubbling Under Hot 100 (Billboard)	10
US Pop 100 (Billboard)	83
