= De Viaje =

2003 studio album by Sin Bandera

Studio album by Sin Bandera
- Released: October 21, 2003
- Recorded: 2003
- Studios: Brava! Music; El Cuarto de Máquinas (Mexico City, Mexico); La Bodega; Musart; Music Corp and Igloo Music (Burbank, CA)
- Genres: Latin pop; latin ballad
- Length: 65:39
- Language: Spanish
- Label: Sony Discos
- Producer: Áureo Baqueiro

Sin Bandera chronology
Sin Bandera (2001)	De Viaje (2003)	Mañana (2005)

Singles from De Viaje
- 1. "Amor Real" Released: May 19, 2003; 2. "Mientes Tan Bien" Released: August 25, 2003; 3. "Qué Lloro" Released: November 23, 2003; 4. "Magia" Released: April 12, 2004; 5. "Contigo" Released: July 12, 2004; 6. "De Viaje" Released: September 6, 2004; 7. "ABC" Released: February 7, 2005

De Viaje (English: Traveling) is the second studio album from Sin Bandera. It was released by Sony Discos on October 21, 2003 (see 2003 in music). The album earned the band their second Latin Grammy Award for Best Pop Album by a Duo or Group with Vocals in the 5th Annual Latin Grammy Awards on Wednesday, September 1, 2004.

== Track listing ==
1. De Viaje
2. Amor Real
3. Ven
4. ABC
5. Contigo
6. Magia
7. Bien
8. Que Lloro
9. Canción Para Los Días Lluviosos
10. Mientes Tan Bien
11. Puede Ser (feat. Presuntos Implicados)
12. Aquí
13. Te Esperaré (Intro)
14. Te Esperaré
15. Suficiente
16. Tal Vez

== Charts ==
Chart (2003)	Peak position
US Top Latin Albums (Billboard)	6
US Latin Pop Albums (Billboard)	4
US Heatseekers Albums (Billboard)	10

== Sales and certifications ==
Region	Certification	Certified units/sales
Argentina (CAPIF)	Gold	20,000^{^}
Central America (CFC)	Platinum	20,000
Mexico (AMPROFON)	4× Platinum	400,000^{^}
United States (RIAA)	2× Platinum (Latin)	300,000
^{^} Shipments figures based on certification alone.
