= Soul Diggaz =

American hip-hop production team

- Occupations: Record producers, songwriters
- Years active: 1998–2015
- Labels: Soul Diggaz Entertainment / Mosley Music Group / The Goldmind Inc.
- Members: Karriem "K-Mack" Mack; Shaun "Bless" Owens; Corté "The Author" Ellis
- Past members: Shalom "J.Storm" Miller2003-2008
- Website: souldiggaz.com

Soul Diggaz is an American R&B and hip-hop production team composed of Karriem "K-Mack" Mack, Shaun "Bless" Owens and songwriter Corté "The Author" Ellis.

Corté Ellis is the younger cousin of hip hop musician Missy Elliott. In 2003, producers Shalom “J.Storm” Miller and Matthew “Major” Irby joined the Soul Diggaz production team under the name Tha Beat Mizrs. They have added celebrity choreographer Bijan Rythmik Williams to the group as talent manager and A&R. The Soul Diggaz are based out of two locations, Midtown Manhattan and Los Angeles, California. They are currently signed to their own production company (Soul Diggaz Entertainment) and Missy Elliott's label, The Goldmind Inc.

== Production credits ==
=== 1999 ===
==== Mary J. Blige – Mary ====
- Can't Believe (featuring Chaka Khan) (unreleased)
- Chasing Lies (unreleased)

=== 2001 ===
==== Toya – Toya ====
- 04. The Truth (also co-written)
- 08. What Else Can I Do (also co-written)

=== 2003 ===
==== Beyoncé – Dangerously In Love ====
- 15. What's It Gonna Be
- Ice Cream (unreleased)

==== GAP Promo: Into The Hollywood Groove ====
- 01. Madonna and Missy Elliott – Into The Hollywood Groove

==== The Fighting Temptations ====
- 01. Beyoncé, Missy Elliott, MC Lyte and Free – Fighting Temptation
- 02. Destiny's Child – I Know

==== Eve Television ====
- 00. Missy Elliott – Eve's Theme

==== Missy Elliott – This Is Not A Test! ====
- 05. Is This Our Last Time (featuring Fabolous)

==== Honey: Music from & Inspired by the Motion Picture ====
- 01. Missy Elliott – Hurt Sumthin'

=== 2004 ===
==== Barbershop 2: Back in Business ====
- 12. Olivia – Private Party

==== Unity: The Official Athens 2004 Olympic Games Album ====
- 02. Destiny's Child and will.i.am – I Know

=== 2005 ===
==== Brooke Valentine – Chain Letter ====
- 02. Taste Of Dis
- 05. Cover Girl

==== Jace – Jace The Name ====
- 04. The Hood (featuring Chill)

==== Olivia – Behind Closed Doors ====
07. Whateva (featuring Young Buck)

==== Jully Black – This Is Me ====
- 01. This Is Me (Intro)
- 02. Hurt U Bad
- 04. Sweat of Your Brow (featuring Demarco)
- 05. Calling You
- 06. Stay The Night
- 07. Free To Love You
- 12. Lovin' You
- 14. Gotta Let You Know (Scream)
- 15. I Travelled
- 16. This Is Me (Outro)
- Sweat Of Your Brow (Soul Diggaz Remix)
- Stay The Night (Soul Diggaz Remix)

==== O.D.B. – A Son Unique ====
- 13. Don't Hurt Me

==== Syleena Johnson – Chapter 3: The Flesh ====
- 10. Time

==== Ashlee Simpson – L.O.V.E. CD-Single ====
- 02. L.O.V.E. (Missy Underground Mix) (featuring Missy Elliott)

=== 2006 ===
==== Fantasia – Fantasia ====
- 14. Bump What Ya Friends Say (featuring Missy Elliott)

=== 2007 ===
==== 8Ball & MJG – Ridin' High ====
- 07. 30 Rock (featuring Diddy)

==== B5 – Don't Talk, Just Listen ====
- 01. Hydrolics (featuring Bow Wow)

==== Bow Wow & Omarion – Face Off ====
- 04. Hey Baby (Jump Off)

==== Cheri Dennis – In And Out Of Love ====
- 03. Portrait of Love

=== 2008 ===
==== Day26 – Day26 ====
- 09. What It Feels Like

==== Izza Kizza – Kizzaland ====
- 02. Flippin' In Rizzide
- 03. I'm The Izza Kizza
- 06. Wham
- 10. Here I Iz
- 11. Ooh La La
- 16. Me And Keesha (Boy Meets Girl)
- 17. Testimonial
- 18. Push

==== Donnie Klang – Just a Rolling Stone ====
- 02. Take You There (featuring Diddy)
- 05. Hollywood Girl

==== Jessica Betts – Jessie Pearl ====
- Moon (co-produced by Missy Elliott)

=== 2009 ===
==== Nat King Cole – Re:Generations ====
- 07. Hit That Jive, Jack! (featuring Izza Kizza)

==== Corté Ellis – TBA ====
- Money On The Floor

==== Cassie – Electro Love ====
- Pretty Face

==== Miss Nana – Little Red Rhyming Hood ====
- The Chirp Chirp Song
- My Hood (featuring Yung Kuntry)

==== Yung Kuntry – TBA ====
- Here Comes The Police
- I'm Official

==== Jada – TBA ====
- It's True

==== Bow Wow – The Green Light Mixtape ====
- I'm Dat Nigga (co-Produced By Big AL and Daffy of souldiggaz)

=== Kelly Rowland – Here I Am ===
- 12. Each Other

=== RichGirl – Non Album Track ===
- 00. You Say

=== 2013 ===
==== Missy Elliott – Block Party ====
- Act a Fool
- All 4 U (featuring Lil Wayne)
- Blow Ya Whistle

==== Sharaya J – TBA ====
- Green Light (featuring Missy Elliott) (co-produced by Missy Elliott)

== Unreleased ==
=== Jessica Betts ===
- You Don't Have To (co-produced by Missy Elliott)

=== Keyshia Cole ===
- Be With You

=== Mr.Peterson ===
- Holla
- Off The Chain
- The Anthem

=== Nina Sky ===
- Good Love

=== So Def ===
- Happy Birthday (featuring Izza Kizza and Missy Elliott) (co-produced by Missy Elliott)

=== Tanu ===
- Secrets

=== Lady Gaga ===
Along with Jeremy Greene & Emoney 3am music group

- Filthy Pop

== Also appear on ==
=== 2003 ===
==== Missy Elliott – This Is Not A Test! ====
- 06. I'm Really Hot
- 10. Let It Bump

=== 2005 ===
==== Tweet – It's Me Again ====
- 07. Things I Don't Mean (featuring Missy Elliott)
- 08. My Man
- 16. When I Need A Man

=== 2007 ===
==== Keyshia Cole – Just like You ====
- 01. Let It Go(featuring Missy Elliott and Lil' Kim)

== Corté Ellis writing credits ==
=== 2004 ===
==== New Edition – One Love ====
- 10. One Love Interlude

==== Fantasia – Free Yourself ====
- 04. Selfish (I Want U 2 Myself) (featuring Missy Elliott)

=== 2005 ===
==== Tweet – It's Me Again ====
- 08. My Man
- 13. Steer

=== 2006 ===
==== Monica – The Makings of Me ====
- 02. A Dozen Roses (You Remind Me)
- 06. Doin' Me Right

==== Fantasia – Fantasia ====
- 10. Two Weeks Notice
- Doin' Me Right (unreleased)

=== 2007 ===
==== Katharine McPhee – Katharine McPhee ====
- 01. Love Story
- 05. Not Ur Girl
- 06. Each Other
- 07. Dangerous
- Take You There (unreleased)

==== Ashley Tisdale – Headstrong ====
- Hurry Up (unreleased)

==== B5 – Don't Talk, Just Listen ====
- 01. Hydrolics (Featuring Bow Wow)

==== Britney Spears – Blackout ====
- 06. Get Naked (I Got A Plan)
- 15. Get Back

=== 2008 ===
==== Donnie Klang – Just a Rolling Stone ====
- 07. Pretty Girls Cry
- 11. Which One
- 12. Love In Stereo
- 00. Take You There
- 00. Hollywood Girl

==== Jennifer Hudson – Jennifer Hudson ====
- 10 Minutes To Cry (unreleased)

==== Ali Lohan – Interpersonal ====
- 05. Close That Door

==== Samantha Jade – My Name Is Samantha Jade ====
- Curious

== Also appears on ==
=== 2004 ===
==== 8Ball & MJG – Living Legends ====
- 16. Memphis City Blues
