= Pasado =

Studio album by Sin Bandera
- Released: November 14, 2006
- Recorded: 2005–2006
- Genre: Latin pop
- Length: 43:14
- Label: Sony BMG
- Producer: Áureo Baqueiro · Mario Domm · Jay de la Cueva

Sin Bandera chronology
| Mañana (2005) | Pasado (2006) | Hasta Ahora (2007) |

Pasado ("Past") is the fourth studio album from Sin Bandera. The album is composed of covers from artists who influenced the duo's musical upbringing. It was released on November 14, 2006.

== Track listing ==
| No. | Title | Writer(s) | Originally released by | Length |
|---|---|---|---|---|
| 1. | "Un buen perdedor" | Franco De Vita | Franco De Vita (1984) | 4:45 |
| 2. | "Hoy el aire huele a ti" | Juan Carlos Calderón | Luis Miguel (1990) | 3:47 |
| 3. | "Si tú no estás aquí" | Rosana Arbelo | Rosana Arbelo (1996) | 3:45 |
| 4. | "Serenata rap" (featuring Jovanotti) | Jovanotti | Jovanotti (1994) | 5:11 |
| 5. | "Love Is in the Air" | Harry Vanda, George Young | John Paul Young (1977) | 4:21 |
| 6. | "Será" | Ilan Chester, Ricardo Montaner | Ricardo Montaner (1991) | 3:34 |
| 7. | "Solo" | José María Cano | Emmanuel (1986) | 4:17 |
| 8. | "Mis impulsos sobre ti" (featuring Aleks Syntek) | Aleks Syntek | Aleks Syntek (1993) | 4:13 |
| 9. | "Si tú no vuelves" | Miguel Bosé, Lanfranco Ferrario, Massimo Grilli | Miguel Bosé (1993) | 4:47 |
| 10. | "¿Lo ves?" | Alejandro Sanz | Alejandro Sanz (1995) | 4:34 |

== Charts ==
| Chart (2006) | Peak position |
|---|---|
| US Billboard 200 | 199 |
| US Top Latin Albums (Billboard) | 12 |
| US Latin Pop Albums (Billboard) | 7 |
| US Heatseekers Albums (Billboard) | 3 |

== Sales and certifications ==
| Region | Certification | Certified units/sales |
|---|---|---|
| Mexico (AMPROFON) | Platinum | 100,000^{^} |
^{^} Shipments figures based on certification alone.
