= Kizzaland =

Mixtape by Izza Kizza
- Released: July 2008
- Genres: Hip-hop, pop, R&B
- Length: 60:22
- Label: Decon

Izza Kizza chronology
Kizzaland (2008)	Mr. Next Year (2009)

Kizzaland is the debut mixtape by Izza Kizza, mixed by Nick Catchdubs. It was released as a free download on his weblog in July 2008. Kizzaland includes mixes by Timbaland, Soul Diggaz and Koolade. One of the songs from the mixtape, "Red Wine", was featured as the opening track of Paste Magazine's June 2008 New-Music Sampler CD. The song "Millionaire" was included in the soundtrack for the Madden NFL 09 video game. On Kizza's YouTube channel there are cartoon and mixtape videos for his songs.

== Track listing ==
1. "Intro"
2. "Flippin’ in the Rizzide"
3. "I’m the Izza Kizza"
4. "Millionaire" (Preview)
5. "Walk the Dog" (Featuring Missy Elliott)
6. "Wham!"
7. "Timbo Freestyle"
8. "Tell ‘Em What My Name Iz"
9. "Red Wine"
10. "Here I Izz"
11. "Ooh La La" (Preview)
12. "Living My Dreams" (Preview)
13. "Don’t Stop Go!"
14. "They’re Everywhere"
15. "Hello" (Featuring Christian Rich)
16. "Me & Keesha (Boy Meets Girl)"
17. "Testimonial"
18. "Push"
19. "Outro"
20. "Georgie Porgie" (Bonus)
