= The Mad Room =

1969 film by Bernard Girard

- Theatrical release poster
- Directed by: Bernard Girard
- Screenplay by: Bernard Girard; A. Martin Zweiback
- Based on: play Ladies in Retirement by Reginald Denham; Edward Percy film Ladies in Retirement written by Reginald Denham; Garrett Fort
- Produced by: Norman Maurer
- Starring: Stella Stevens; Shelley Winters; Skip Ward; Carole Cole; Severn Darden; Beverly Garland; Michael Burns; Barbara Sammeth
- Cinematography: Harry Stradling Jr.
- Edited by: Pat Somerset
- Music by: Dave Grusin
- Production company: Columbia Pictures
- Distributed by: Columbia Pictures
- Release date: May 1, 1969
- Running time: 92 minutes
- Country: United States
- Language: English

The Mad Room is a 1969 American horror drama film directed by Bernard Girard, and starring Stella Stevens, Shelley Winters, Skip Ward, Carole Cole, Severn Darden, Beverly Garland, Michael Burns, and Barbara Sammeth. It is a loose remake of the 1941 film Ladies in Retirement, which had been adapted from a 1940 play of the same title written by Reginald Denham and Edward Percy.

The film was released by Columbia Pictures on May 1, 1969.

== Plot ==
Ellen Hardy, working as a live-in assistant to wealthy widow Mrs. Armstrong, gets a call from the mental institution where her younger brother George and sister Mandy have been living since they were accused of killing their parents when they were six and four years old. George is turning 18, and rather than send him and Mandy to an adult facility, Ellen takes them back to live with her in Mrs. Armstrong's large house. Afraid of what their reception would be if the others knew the truth, Ellen conceals their dangerous history.

Upon arriving at the house, Mandy insists that she and George have a designated "mad room," a place where they can go to be alone when they are frustrated. Ellen reluctantly agrees to give them access to the former Mr. Armstrong's study despite the fact that Mrs. Armstrong refuses to let anyone in it. One night Mrs. Armstrong discovers Mandy in the study, and confronts Ellen about her mounting suspicion that they are keeping something from her. While Mandy and George eavesdrop from outside the room, Ellen finally breaks down under her questioning and tells Mrs. Armstrong about their grim childhood and the suspicion that either George, Mandy, or the both of them had killed their parents with a butcher knife. Mrs. Armstrong explains to Ellen that she can't keep the children at the house anymore, and goes to bed frightened.

The following morning, Ellen screams when she discovers Mrs. Armstrong dead in the "mad room," slashed by a saber. Mandy and George run to the scene, and both scream in horror and accuse each other of being the murderer. Ellen quickly turns into action, and to cover-up the crime, insists that they tell the rest of the staff that Mrs. Armstrong has gone away on business unexpectedly. After another incident at the house, George and Mandy begin to find Ellen's ability to lie unsettling and suspect her of killing Mrs. Armstrong as well as their parents.

Ellen's nerves begin to fray, and tries to convince her fiancé Sam, the stepson of Mrs. Armstrong, that they should send the children away. She finally snaps after seeing that the family dog has discovered a dismembered portion of Mrs. Armstrong's body (her hand), and has brought it out into the yard. She kills the dog and in the final scene is discovered by Sam, kneeling in the basement by the furnace as she once did the night she murdered her parents.

== Cast ==
- Stella Stevens as Ellen Hardy
- Shelley Winters as Mrs. Armstrong
- Skip Ward as Sam Aller
- Carole Cole as Chris
- Severn Darden as Nate
- Beverly Garland as Mrs. Racine
- Michael Burns as George Hardy
- Barbara Sammeth as Mandy Hardy
- Lloyd Haynes as Dr. Marion Kincaid
- Jennifer Bishop as Mrs. Ericson
- Gloria Manon as Edna
- Lou Kane as Armand Racine

== Release ==
=== Home media ===
The Mad Room was released for the first time on DVD by SPHE on March 4, 2011.

On October 25, 2023, Via Vision Entertainment's Imprint label released The Mad Room on Blu-ray for the first time worldwide. This limited edition includes a high-definition 1080p presentation and a slipcase with unique artwork.

== Reception ==
Critical response for The Mad Room has been mixed to negative.

Variety noted the acting, and scenery as being the better part of the film, but criticized the film's weak story, predictable plot twist, and tendency towards melodrama. Time Out called the film "disastrously renovated for contemporary consumption", and noted the film as being routine.

Alternately, Howard Thompson of The New York Times gave the film a positive review. Thompson praised the film for its acting, direction, tension, and cinematography; calling it "a fine suspense-shocker" Paul Mavis from DVD Talk awarded the film 3.5 out of 5 stars, writing "Not "horrific" by today's standards, but acceptably frightening and strange, with some nice direction and strong performances by the cast, particularly the underrated Stella Stevens. Fans of the two stars, and appreciators of the genre from this time period, will certainly enjoy this."
