= Carole Cole =

American actress (1944–2009)

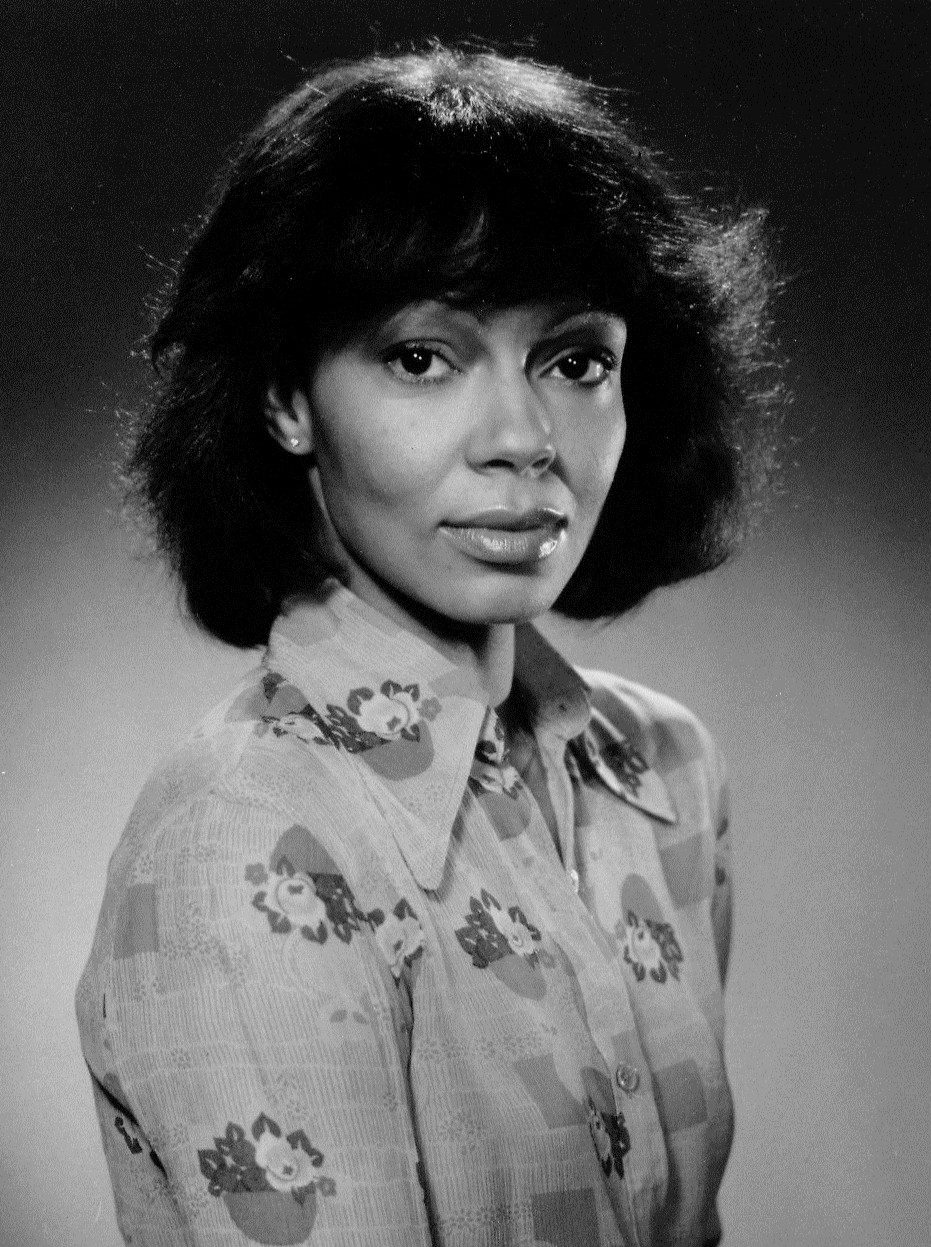
- Cole in 1976
- Born: October 17, 1944; Medford, Massachusetts, U.S.
- Died: May 19, 2009 (aged 64); Los Angeles, California, U.S.
- Other name: Cookie Cole
- Occupations: Actress; music producer
- Years active: 1956–2006
- Children: 3
- Parent(s): Nat King Cole (father); Maria Cole (mother)
- Relatives: Natalie Cole (sister)

Carole Cole (October 17, 1944 – May 19, 2009) was an American actress, music producer, and the CEO of King Cole Productions. She was the daughter of singer and jazz pianist Nat King Cole and jazz singer Maria Cole, and the elder sister of singer Natalie Cole.

== Early life ==
Cole was born in Medford, Massachusetts, and was the adopted daughter of Nat King Cole and adopted sister of Natalie Cole. Her biological mother, Carol Hawkins, was the sister of Nat King Cole's wife, Maria. Through her mother, Cole was a grandniece of educator Charlotte Hawkins Brown.

== Career ==
Cole received an associate's degree at Cazenovia College and pursued a vital acting career that spanned theater, television and film. In 1964, she signed a contract with Columbia Pictures New Talent program, along with friend and colleague Harrison Ford. During her acting career she starred in the films The Silencers (1966), The Mad Room, (1969), Promise at Dawn (1970), and The Taking of Pelham One Two Three (1974). She appeared on television in Positively Black (1975) and was a series costar on the NBC sitcom Sanford and Son. On stage, Cole appeared in Gore Vidal's Weekend (1968), "Pericles," (1974 New York Shakespeare Festival [now known as The Public], Delacorte Theatre Shakespeare in the Park), and What If It Had Turned Up Heads (1972). She also appeared as a series regular in the role of Ellie, the daughter of Grady Wilson, in the 1970s TV series Grady (a spin-off of the highly successful Sanford and Son).

In 1991, Cole became the CEO of King Cole Productions, where she managed the licensing of the Nat King Cole estate. She produced such albums as Christmas for Kids: From One to Ninety Two, The World of Nat King Cole, Transcriptions: Nat King Cole Trio, amongst many others. For 20 years under her supervision, Nat King Cole posthumously released an album nearly every year.

In 2009, shortly before her death from lung cancer, Cole released Re: Generations, a collaboration of international artists providing their artistic interpretations and tributes to specific works of Nat King Cole. She funded the album which included tracks performed by the Roots, will.i.am, Cee Lo Green, Natalie Cole, Bebel Gilberto and Brazilian Girls.

== Personal life ==
The eldest of Nat King Cole's children, she had three children, Caroline Clarke, Sage Zailm Cole, and Harleigh Maxim Cole. Her eldest daughter, Caroline, was placed for adoption immediately after birth (against Cole's wishes) but the two met in 2002 and subsequently developed a close bond. Cole died on May 19, 2009, from lung cancer at the age of 64. At the time, her sister Natalie was in another hospital undergoing kidney transplant surgery.

== Filmography ==
- The Silencers (1966) – Waitress (uncredited)
- Model Shop (1969) – Barbara
- The Mad Room (1969) – Chris
- Promise at Dawn (1970) – Louison – a nurse
- The Taking of Pelham One Two Three (1974) – The Secretary (Hostage)
