= Mañana (album) =

2005 studio album by Sin Bandera

Studio album by Sin Bandera
- Released: November 22, 2005
- Recorded: 2005
- Studio: Backroom Studios (Glendale, CA); Brava! Music; El Cuarto de Máquinas (Mexico City, Mexico); Igloo Music (Burbank, CA); La Chicharra Estudios (Playa del Carmen, Quintana Roo, Mexico); Soul Diggaz Studios (San Diego, CA)
- Genre: Latin pop; latin ballad
- Length: 56:18
- Language: Spanish
- Label: Sony BMG Norte
- Producer: Áureo Baqueiro; Brian McKnight; Soul Diggaz; Alejandro Espinosa

Sin Bandera chronology
De Viaje (2003)	Mañana (2005)	Pasado (2006)

Singles from Mañana
- 1. "Suelta Mi Mano" Released: September 26, 2005; 2. "Qué Me Alcance La Vida" Released: January 23, 2006; 3. "Tócame" Released: May 15, 2006

Mañana (English: Tomorrow) is the third studio album from Sin Bandera. The album was released by Sony BMG Norte on November 22, 2005 (see 2005 in music). The album witch produced by Áureo Baqueiro, co-produced by Brian McKnight, Soul Diggaz and Alejandro Espionsa. It was nominated as the Latin Grammy Award for Best Pop Album by a Duo or Group with Vocals, in the 7th Annual Latin Grammy Awards held on Thursday November 2, 2006, losing to Guapa by La Oreja de Van Gogh.

== Track listing ==
All tracks are written by Leonel García and Noel Schajris, except where noted.

No.	Title	Writer(s)	Producer (es)	Length
1.	"Qué Me Alcance La Vida"	Leonel García; Noel Schajris	Áureo Baqueiro	3:50
2.	"No Voy"	Leonel García; Noel Schajris	Áureo Baqueiro	4:04
3.	"A Ti"	Leonel García	Áureo Baqueiro	3:40
4.	"Tócame"	Leonel García	Áureo Baqueiro	4:42
5.	"Junto A Ti (GMT Version)" (Feat. Vico C)	Luis Lozada; Leonel García	Áureo Baqueiro	4:14
6.	"Lo Que Llamas Amor" (Feat. Yung Kuntry)	Leonel García; Noel Schajris	Soul Diggaz	4:56
7.	"Suelta Mi Mano"	Leonel García; Noel Schajris	Áureo Baqueiro	4:02
8.	"Cómo Voy a Odiarte"	Leonel García	Áureo Baqueiro	4:27
9.	"Cómo Tú y Cómo Yo" (Feat. Laura Pausini)	Leonel García; Noel Schajris	Áureo Baqueiro	4:38
10.	"No, No" (Feat. Yung Kuntry)	Leonel García; Noel Schajris	Soul Diggaz	4:56
11.	"La Razón Eres Tú (Look What You Make Me Do)" (Feat. Brian McKnight)	Brian McKnight; Adapt: Spanish: Leonel García · Noel Schajris	Brian McKnight	4:13
12.	"Cuando Ya No Te Esperaba"	Leonel García; Noel Schajris	Brian McKnight	4:42
13.	"Junto A Ti (Urban Version)" (Feat. Vico C)	Luis Lozada; Leonel García	Alejandro Espinosa	4:03
Total length:				56:18

== Charts ==
=== Weekly charts ===
Chart (2005)	Peak position
US Billboard 200	170
US Top Latin Albums (Billboard)	4
US Latin Pop Albums (Billboard)	2
US Heatseekers Albums (Billboard)	2

=== Year-end charts ===
Chart (2006)	Position
US Top Latin Albums (Billboard)	31

== Sales and certifications ==
Region	Certification	Certified units/sales
Argentina (CAPIF)	Gold	20,000^{^}
Mexico (AMPROFON)	Platinum+Gold	150,000^{^}
^{^} Shipments figures based on certification alone.
