= Just a Rolling Stone =

Studio album by Donnie Klang
- Released: September 2, 2008
- Genres: R&B; dance-pop
- Length: 54:06
- Labels: Bad Boy; Atlantic
- Producers: Diddy (exec.); Amadeus; Philippe-Marc Anquetil; Buttaz; Channel 7; Danja; Jack Knight; C.J. Lee-Joe; Malay; Soul Diggaz; Tricky Stewart; The-Dream; Mario Winans; Young Boyz

Singles from Just a Rolling Stone
- 1. "Take You There" Released: March 23, 2008

Just a Rolling Stone is the only studio album by American singer Donnie Klang. It was released by Bad Boy Records and Atlantic Records on September 2, 2008 in Canada and the United States. After winning the reality singing contest Making the Band 4 in 2007, Klang was offered a solo contract by Bad Boy head and MtB man of the house Sean Combs instead of a spot in the all-male R&B group Day26. Combs consulted a variety of writers and producers to work with Klang on his debut, including The-Dream and Soul Diggaz as well as Channel 7, Mario Winans, and Tricky Stewart.

Just a Rolling Stone garnered mixed to negative reviews from music critics, many of whom found the material too outdated and compared Klang unfavorably with Justin Timberlake. The album debuted and peaked at number 19 on the Billboard 200 and entered the top five on the US Top R&B/Hip-Hop Albums. It spawned a sole single "Take You There", which was released on March 23, 2008 and peaked at number 83 on the Billboard Pop 100 chart. The album remains Klang's only album with Bad Boy after leaving the label in 2010.

== Critical reception ==
Professional ratings
Review scores
Source	Rating
AllMusic	2.5/5 stars
Artistdirect	3/5 stars

Jon Caramanica, writing for The New York Times, remarked that on Just a Rolling Stone, Klang "hews closely to a current template for white-soul success: the recent work of Justin Timberlake, an airy-voiced former boy band star, with Timbaland, an eccentric visionary [...] He's a pleasant, if not altogether emphatic, singer. At times he sounds as if he were laying down the demo vocals for someone else to sing on top of – meaning that these songs, many of them great, seem to shape him, not the other way around." Similarly, AllMusic editor Matt Collar found that Just a Rolling Stone "positions Klang as a kind of lesser Justin Timberlake or less amusing Robin Thicke. In any case, the results on Just a Rolling Stone are less interesting than either of those aforementioned R&B crooners and more along the lines of a Color Me Badd-reboot. Which is to say, Klang's music is oddly outdated." PopMatters critic Colin McGuire felt that "Mr. Combs' imprint certainly doesn't save Klang's debut enough to make it worth listening to. Yeah, his stone may be rolling. It just appears it’s going in the wrong direction."

== Chart performance ==
The album peaked at number 19 on the US Billboard 200 and dropped off after three weeks. It fared better on the Top R&B/Hip-Hop Albums chart, where it debuted at number five and stayed on the chart for seven weeks.

== Track listing ==
No.	Title	Writer(s)	Producer(s)	Length
1.	"Intro"	Donnie Klang; Seven Aurelius; Mario Winans; Yinon Yahel	Channel 7; Yahel^{[a]}	3:09
2.	"Take You There" (featuring Diddy)	Corte Ellis; Lashaun Owens; Karriem Mack; Maurice Wade; Nigel Talley; Sean Combs; Klang; Leroy Watson	Soul Diggaz; Mo Chedda^{[a]}; Combs^{[a]}	4:15
3.	"Dr. Love"	Aurelius; Yahel; Jason Desrouleaux; Klang	Channel 7; Yahel^{[a]}	3:23
4.	"Hurt That Body"	Christopher Stewart; Terius Nash	Tricky Stewart; The-Dream	3:12
5.	"Hollywood Girl"	Ellis; Owens; Mack; Wade; Talley	Soul Diggaz; Mo Chedda^{[a]}	3:44
6.	"Pick It Up"	Curtis Austin; Drew Ryan Scott; Jimmy Burney; Sean Alexander; Klang; Patrick Scaglione	Young Boyz	4:32
7.	"Pretty Girls Cry"	Winans; Ellis; Klang	Winans	4:09
8.	"Catch My Breath"	Balewa Muhammad; Candace Nelson; Ezekiel Lewis; Patrick "J. Que" Smith	Danja	4:24
9.	"Bedroom" (Interlude)	Aurelius; Klang; Wanita Woodgett	Channel 7	1:12
10.	"Not a Love Song"	Winans; Klang; Mary Brown	Winans	3:53
11.	"Which One"	Winans; Ellis; Klang	Winans	3:29
12.	"Love in Stereo"	Aurelius; Yahel; Ellis; Klang	Channel 7; Yahel^{[a]}	3:13
13.	"Just a Rolling Stone" (Interlude)	Winans; Klang	Winans	1:46
14.	"You're My Idol"	Jack Knight; Loick Essien; Iain James Farquharson; Christopher Lee-Joe; Klang	Lee-Joe; Knight; Philippe-Marc Anquetil	3:44
15.	"The Pain" (Interlude)	Antwan "Amadeus" Thompson; Ralph "Buttaz" Kearns; Theo Bowen; Klang	Thompson; Kearns	1:37
16.	"The Rain"	Aurelius; Klang; Desrouleaux; Uriel Kadouch	Channel 7; The Fliptones^{[a]}	4:03

Circuit City bonus track
No.	Title	Writer(s)	Producer(s)	Length
17.	"Beautiful Escape"	Tiff Starr; Devon Golder; James Ho	Malay	4:01

iTunes bonus tracks
No.	Title	Writer(s)	Producer(s)	Length
17.	"Take You There" (Acapella)	Ellis; Owens; Mack; Wade; Talley; Combs; Klang; Watson	Soul Diggaz; Mo Chedda^{[a]}; Combs^{[a]}	3:59
18.	"Take You There" (Video)			4:04
19.	"Bedroom"	Winans; Brandon Howard	Winans	2:00
20.	"Digital Booklet"

Notes

- ^{^[a]} signifies a co-producer

== Personnel ==
- Channel 7 – track 1, 9
- Sean "Diddy" Combs and Soul Diggaz - track 2
- Channel 7 and Yinon Yahel – track 3, 12
- Tricky Stewart and The-Dream – track 4
- Soul Diggaz – track 5
- Young Boyz – track 6
- Mario Winans – track 7, 10, 11, 13
- Danja and The Clutch – track 8
- Philippe-Marc Anquetil and Christopher Lee-Joe – track 14
- Antwan "Amadeus" Thompson – track 15
- Channel 7 and The Fliptones – track 16
- Malay – track 17

== Charts ==
Chart (2008)	Peak position
US Billboard 200	19
US Top R&B/Hip-Hop Albums (Billboard)	5
