= Don't Talk, Just Listen =

Studio album by B5
- Released: September 10, 2007
- Length: 54:23
- Labels: Bad Boy; Atlantic
- Producers: Blaze; Bryan-Michael Cox; Danja; Emile Ghantous; Eric Hudson; Erik Nelson; Mr. Pyro; Harve Pierre; Soul Diggaz; Shea Taylor; The Underdogs; Kevin Wales; Mario Winans

B5 chronology
B5 (2005)	Don't Talk, Just Listen (2007)

Don't Talk, Just Listen is the second studio album by American R&B group B5. It was released by Bad Boy Records on September 10, 2007, in the United Kingdom and on September 11 in the United States. The lone single was "Hydrolics" featuring Bow Wow.

== Critical reception ==
Billboard editor Chuck Eddy wrote: "On the second album by Bad Boy's clean-cut teen pop R&B boy band, syrupy high-register harmonies channel makeout music signposts from doo-wop to DeBarge, vocal acrobatics moonwalk into Michael Jackson territory and bubbly raps emerge from the lush mush. Though their vocal rhythms can get convoluted, the five adolescent Breeding brothers know how to skid over drum-line beats and '80s electronics." Vibe critic Julianne Shepherd wrote: "Gone are the gossamer voices of tweendom; young-adult life now comes with groupies, hoopties, and heartbreak. For their second album, the Diddy-discovered Breeding brothers snag more mature tracks [...] The writing is often super, cannily masking the boys' sometimes (too) thin voices."

== Chart performance ==
The album debuted at number 27 on the US Billboard 200, selling about 19,000 copies in its first week. It also reached the top five of Billboard's Top R&B/Hip-Hop Albums chart.

== Track listing ==
Don't Talk, Just Listen track listing
No.	Title	Writer(s)	Producer(s)	Length
1.	"Hydrolics" (featuring Bow Wow)	Carlos Hassan; Corte Ellis; Karriem Mack; LaShaun Owens; Mathew Irby; Nigel Talley; Shad Gregory Moss	Soul Diggaz	3:56
2.	"How You Not Gonna"	Mario Winans; Mike Winans	Mario Winans	4:02
3.	"Right to Left"	Bryan-Michael Cox; Kendrick Dean; Adonis Shropshire	Cox	3:47
4.	"Erika Kane"	Cox; Dean; Shropshire; Stephen Bishop	Cox	3:51
5.	"She Got It Like That"	Fred "Blaze" Crawford; Kevin Wales; Patrick Breeding	Crawford; Wales	4:42
6.	"Tear Drops"	Ellis; Floyd Nathaniel Hills	Danja	3:26
7.	"In My Bedroom"	Mischke Butler; Hills; Shea Taylor	Taylor	3:34
8.	"All Over Again"	Antonio Dixon; Damon Thomas; Eric Dawkins; Harvey Mason Jr.; Steve Russell	The Underdogs; Wales	4:05
9.	"What It Do"	Dixon; Thomas; Dawkins; Mason; Russell	The Underdogs	3:43
10.	"No One Else"	Gary B. Baker; Joel Thomas; William Darrell Perry	Harve Pierre	3:04
11.	"I Must Love Drama"	Andre D. Meritt; Eric Hudson	Hudson	4:15
12.	"So Incredible"	Carnell Breeding; Dustin Breeding; Crawford; Wales; P. Breeding	Pierre	4:08
13.	"Things I Would Do"	Dixon; Thomas; Dawkins; Mason; Russell; Andre Brisset; Daen Simmons; Durrell Babbs; Emile Ghantous; Erik Nelson; Richard Castro; Bishop	The Underdogs; Wales	3:15
14.	"Rockstar" (hidden track)	Simmons; Ghantous; Nelson; Glenn Lott; Kelly Breeding; Castro	Ghantous; Mr. Pyro; Nelson	4:19
Total length:				54:23

Circuit City bonus track
No.	Title	Writer(s)	Producer(s)	Length
15.	"Boom Boom Boom"	Butler	The Co-Stars; Butler	3:11

== Personnel ==
Credits for Don't Talk Just Listen adapted from Allmusic.

- Adonis – Audio Production
- Andre 'Hotbox' Brissett – Audio Production
- Chris Athens – Mastering
- Chapman Bachler – Photography
- Gary Baker – Composer
- Carnell Breeding – Composer
- Kelly Breeding – Composer
- Patrick Breeding – Composer
- Tank – Composer, Writer, Producer, Background
- Blaze – Engineer, Various
- Adrian Breeding – Stylist
- Briss – Various
- Andre Brissett – Composer, Producer
- Mike Butler – Engineer
- Tiffany Bynum – Production Assistant
- Candice Childress – Production Coordination
- Sean "Puffy" Combs – Executive Producer
- Bryan-Michael Cox – Audio Production, Bass, Composer, Drums, Guitar (Bass), Keyboards, Producer, Programming
- Fred Crawford – Arranger, Instrumentation, Producer, Vocal Producer
- Nathaniel "Danja" Hills – Audio Production, Composer
- Eric Dawkins – Composer
- Kendrick "WyldCard" Dean – Composer, Audio Production, Producer, Strings
- Steve "Rock Star" Dickey – Engineer
- Antonio Dixon – Composer
- Corte Ellis – Composer
- Fred "Blaze" Crawford – Audio Production
- John Frye – Mixing
- Rob Gold – Art Manager, Producer
- Thaddis "Kuk" Harrell – Engineer
- Carlos Hassan – Composer
- Nate Hertweck – Assistant
- John Holmes – Engineer
- Eric Hudson – Audio Production, Composer, Instrumentation, Producer, Various
- Jun Ishizeki – Engineer
- Rob Knox – Audio Production, Composer, Producer, Various
- Mack Woodward – Audio Engineer
- Riley Mackin – Assistant
- Harvey Mason Jr. – Composer
- Lidia McKinney – Stylist
- Justin "Just One" Miller – Engineer
- Justin Milner – Engineer
- Mischke – Audio Production
- Gwendolyn Niles – A&R
- Michael Patterson – Mixing
- Phantom Boyz – Audio Production
- Harve "Joe Hooker" Pierre – Executive Producer
- Michelle Piza – Packaging Manager
- John Regan – Art Direction, Design
- Aaron Renner – Engineer
- Ruben Rivera – Assistant
- Steve Russell – Composer
- Alexis Seton – Engineer
- Soul Diggaz – Producer, Audio Production
- Adonis Shropshire – Vocal Producer, Vocals
- Shea Taylor – Audio Production
- Damon Thomas – Composer
- Sam Thomas – Mixing
- Sharon Tucker – A&R
- The Underdogs – Audio Production, Mixing, Producer, Various
- Kevin Wales – Audio Production, Composer, Engineer, Executive Producer, Producer
- Roxy Wales – Stylist
- Mario Winans – Audio Production, Composer, Producer
- Mike Winans – Composer
- Wyldcard – Strings

== Charts ==
Weekly chart performance for Don't Talk, Just Listen
Chart (2007)	Peak position
US Billboard 200	27
US Top R&B/Hip-Hop Albums (Billboard)	5
