= B5 (group) =

American contemporary R&B group

- Also known as: TNT Boyz, AUDIO
- Origin: St. Petersburg, Florida, U.S.
- Genres: R&B; Hip-hop
- Years active: 2001–2014, 2018–present
- Labels: Bad Boy, Block, UpFront, Motown, Walt Disney
- Members: Dustin Breeding; Kelly Breeding; Patrick Breeding; Carnell Breeding; Bryan Breeding

B5, previously known as TNT Boyz and Audio, is an American R&B group originating from St. Petersburg, Florida, which later relocated to Atlanta, Georgia. The group consists of the five Breeding family brothers, Dustin Michael (b. October 8, 1987), Kelly Allen (b. February 27, 1989), Patrick Owen (b. September 19, 1990), Carnell Frederick (b. Hunnicutt, November 30, 1991), and Bryan Jesse (b. October 14, 1993). Formerly known as the TNT Boyz, consisting of the four oldest brothers, the band renamed to B5 after the youngest brother Bryan, joined the group.

Since 2018, the members of the band have been working together once more as B5.

== Career ==
=== TNT Boyz (1998–2001) ===
The band started in 1998 when Dustin, Kelly, Patrick, and Carnell formed TNT Boyz, with Dustin and Patrick as lead singers. Encouraged by their mother and aunt to pursue music careers, the brothers entered and won numerous competitions, including shows put together by Radio Disney. When Bryan joined in, the band changed its name to B5 to denote Breeding 5, akin to The Jackson 5 being denoted as "J5".

=== B5 (2001–2014) ===
The band took part in tours and appearing in shows alongside acts including Akon, Mario Winans, Kanye West, Ginuwine, Usher, Fantasia, Bow Wow, Chris Brown, T-Pain, Omarion, Soulja Boy and NSYNC. While passing through Atlanta, GA, their Manager Jim McMahan introduced them to L. A. Reid and Jermaine Dupri; after meeting Sean "P.Diddy" Combs, they were signed by Bad Boy Entertainment. Diddy produced B5's self-titled debut album along with other top producers including Rodney Jerkins, Ryan Leslie, Sean Garrett, Corna Boyz and Veit Renn. The lead single, "All I Do" is based on a cover of The Jackson 5's original single "All I Do Is Think of You". It is similar to a cover released by Troop and was suggested to them by Jerkins.

The album B5 reached number seven on the Top R&B/Hip-Hop chart, after entering at #19 in its first week of release on the Billboard 200 and #11 on the Billboard Top R&B/Hip-Hop Albums chart. Their next single, "U Got Me", did not make Billboard Top 200. The debut album included the hit singles "All I Do" and "U Got Me" which peaked at #9 on Radio Disney and hung on the BET "106 & Park" Top 10 for weeks.

On November 12, 2005, while performing on the Radio Disney Jingle Jam Tour at Brookdale Mall, thousands of girls rushed the stage and at the group and a riot ensued. Members of the group were stripped of shirts, shoes and earrings.

Don't Talk, Just Listen was the second album released, with the help of producers such as Bryan Michael Cox, Mario Winans, Soul Diggaz, Danja, Blaze, The Underdogs, Insomoniax, and Mischke. "Hydrolics", featuring Bow Wow, was the first single. The CD was executive produced by Diddy, Kevin Wales and Harve Pierre. It was released on September 11, 2007, and was their last album on Bad Boy Records. After having little success with the name Audio, the group returned to the name B5. The single "Say Yes" was released in May 2013 with an associated music video.

In 2015, Dustin began focusing on his solo career. In November 2015, he released his single "Pay It Forward" as the lead track from his Different EP.

=== 2018: The Return of B5 ===
On July 27, 2018, B5 released their comeback single "Do That", which was their first song together in five years.

== Discography ==
=== Studio albums ===
- B5 (2005)
- Don't Talk, Just Listen (2007)

=== EPs ===
- Still Think About You (2025)

=== Singles ===
- "All I Do" (2005), Bad Boy Records/Universal
- "U Got Me" (2005), Bad Boy Records/Universal
- ”Heartbreak” (2005), Bad Boy Records/Universal
- ”Dance For You” (2005), Bad Boy Records/Universal
- "Hydrolics" (featuring Bow Wow) (2007), Bad Boy Records/Warner
- "Say Yes" (2013), Upfront Megatainment/Motown Records
- "Cookie" (2013), Upfront Megatainment/Motown Records
- "Do That" (2018)
- "Wave" (2019)
- “Give It Back” (2024)
- “ Still Think About You “(2025), The Exclusives/Universal

=== Tours ===
- "Radio Disney Jingle Jams Tour" (2005) B5 (Head Liner), Everlife, and SAVVY (Berto Ornelas Now Knows as MANNIE B, Sarah LeMaire Now Known as Gigi, Drew Reinartz, Lauryn Story-Witt, Andrew Stern, Alan Shaw, Mariah Mcbride, and Nikki Frishber)
