= Sin Bandera =

Mexican musical duo

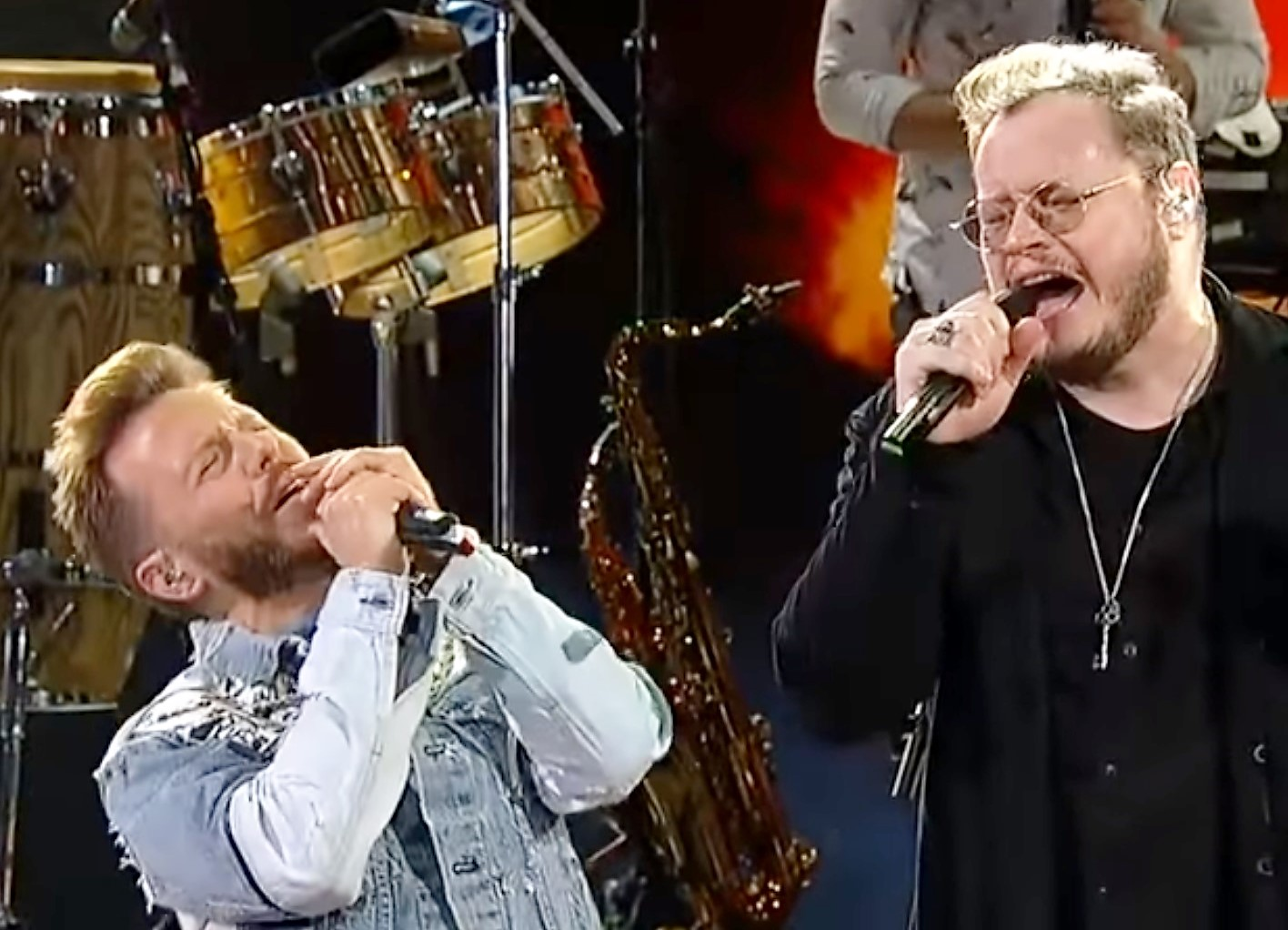
- Sin Bandera (Schajris at left, García at right) singing at Viña del Mar International Song Festival in 2017

Background information
- Origin: Mexico City, Mexico
- Years active: 2000–2008; 2015–present
- Label: Sony Discos
- Members: Leonel García; Noel Schajris

Sin Bandera is a Mexican duo who perform romantic ballads, consisting of Mexican singer-songwriter Leonel Garcia and Argentine-Mexican singer-songwriter Noel Schajris. They formed in Mexico City in 2000. They became one of the most popular artists after their eponymous debut studio album, Sin Bandera, was released on November 20, 2001.

== Biography ==
=== 2002-2002: Formation, self-titled album ===
Leonel García (from Mexico) had the idea to be a soloist. He showed dexterity with the guitar and his voice, but this project remained frozen at the record companies; meanwhile, García wrote songs for other recognized artists from the 1990s such as Lynda Thomas. At the same time, Noel Schajris (from Argentina, now a nationalized Mexican) was preparing another solo album after making his debut in 1999. Both being musicians, composers and singers, they discovered the ideal formula to unite their talents and personalities in 2000.

There was immediate chemistry: they spoke about their favorite music, of the albums they bought, and about the singer-songwriters they were most interested in, and coincided in everything. The two wanted to sing, but Noel preferred the piano, and Leonel, the guitar, for which at no time there was collision of interests, but an integration of musical inclinations.

In their first meeting they wrote three songs during a single day. Composing songs was the best way for them to get to know each other. After having separate musical experiences, it turned out to be very exciting to feel the force that they achieved together. They wrote and recorded their self-titled debut album, which touched the feelings of the romantic public with the production of the fellow musician Aureo Baqueiro.

The name "Sin Bandera" (Without a Flag) was adopted to transmit the idea to worry about world union. They both thought that we lived in a separate society, that we get to the point where we no longer believe in ideology or in language, and we end up thinking that one is the enemy of the other. As love and music do not have a flag, from that they were inspired to name their new musical adventure. The duo wants to spread that message through the music: We are one and that feeling is the best route to communication; love is the fundamental energy that gives sense to all.

"Entra En Mi Vida" ("Come Into My Life"), their first single, is a song written by themselves, in which they express the magic of love and the emotions that occur upon a first encounter with that special someone. It was also the main theme of the Mexican telenovela Cuando Seas Mía (When You're Mine). The singles "Kilómetros" ("Kilometres") and "Sirena" ("Mermaid") also became favorites among the young public. Their success extended to Spain, Argentina, the United States, Costa Rica and many other countries around the world.

In 2002, Sin Bandera was nominated for a Latin Grammy award for Best Group Album, which was awarded to them in Los Angeles, California on September 18. It received various ¡Oye! and Lo Nuestro (Best Pop Album) awards, and an MTV Latino award (for Best Artist).

=== 2003-2004: De Viaje ===
After a few restless months, in 2003, they recorded "Amor Real" ("Real Love"), which also served as the main theme for that homonymous soap opera. The duo was also responsible for opening concerts for Alejandro Sanz in the United States, and shortly after, in Spain.

By the end of 2003, their second album, De Viaje (Traveling), arrived, produced again by Baqueiro. It likewise approached the millions of sales at international level, little by little. The album also remained for 16 continuous weeks in the lists of Billboard and its Hot Latin Tracks. Among the 16 tracks of the album there was "Que Lloro" ("I Cry"), "Mientes tan Bien" ("You Lie So Well"), "Amor Real", "Bien" ("Good"), "Magia" ("Magic"), "Canción para días lluviosos" ("Song For Rainy Days") and "Puede ser" ("May Be"), which was a duet with Presuntos Implicados. Of these, the first three were number 1's in Mexico, an achievement only RBD and Shakira have managed to obtain.

In 2004 they toured Venezuela, Bolivia, Argentina, Paraguay, Chile, Ecuador, Colombia, Mexico, the United States and Spain, among other countries. They were also nominated again for the fifth annual Latin Grammy awards, where they won the award for "Best Pop Vocal Group Album" for the second time. After a successful gain as Better Pop Vocal Album by Duet or Group- by second consecutive year. Also, after a successful miniseason in Teatro Metropólitan of Mexico (3,300 spectators), they received the opportunity to play for the first time in the Auditorio Nacional of Mexico City (9,600 spectators) with two dates in the middle of October.

=== 2005-2009: Mañana and Pasado ===
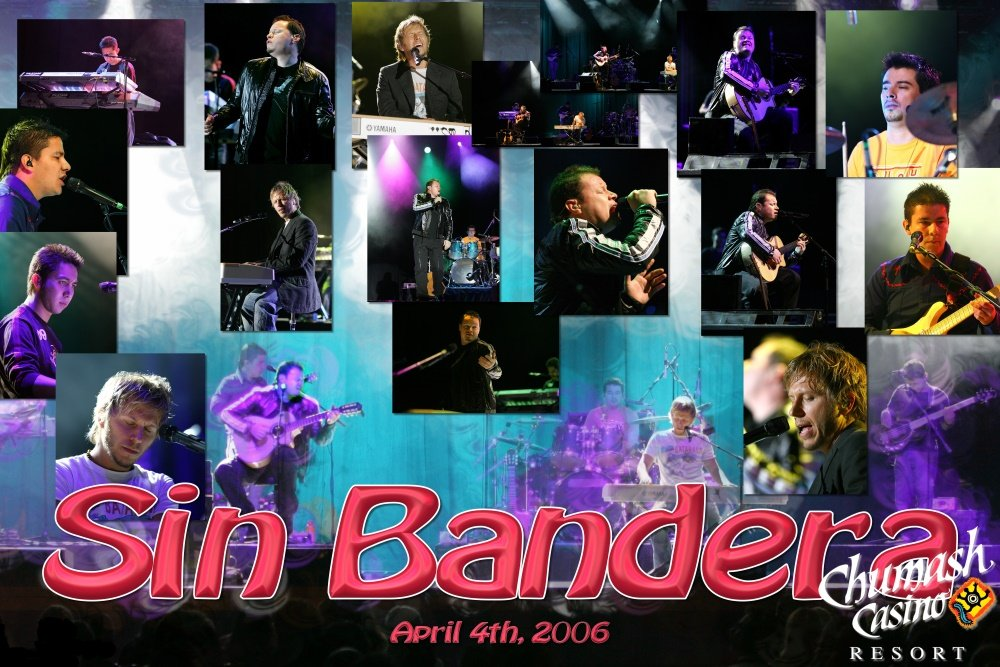
Collage of Sin Bandera performing, 2006

Their album Mañana (Tomorrow), which was released on November 22, 2005, contains the single "Suelta mi mano" ("Let Go of My Hand"). This album also contains a soft atmosphere duet, "Como tú y como yo" ("Like You And Like Me"), sung with Italian pop singer Laura Pausini.

Their latest album, Pasado (Past), is a sequel to Mañana. This time, Sin Bandera teamed up with noted producers Áureo Baqueiro, Mario Domm and Jay de la Cueva. The emphasis this time is on international ballads of the 1970s and 1980s. Sin Bandera reworks the tunes with a slower, more soulful R&B touch.

The CD also includes De Vita's philosophical "Un buen perdedor" ("A Good Loser"), Sanz's anthemic and Beatlesque "¿Lo Ves?" ("Do You See it?"), Montaner's lovely but haunting "Será?" ("Could it Be?"), and an English-language rendition of "Love Is in the Air."

"These are the tunes which fascinated us when we were young adolescents," García said. "Tunes like 'Serenata Rap' ("Rap Serenade") and 'Mis Impulsos Sobre Ti' ("My Impulses About You") are the songs that move us (now)."

Their greatest hits album, Hasta Ahora ('Til Now) was released on December 4, 2007, as an individual CD and in a special-edition package which included a DVD of their commercially released music videos.

In 2007, the duo decided to split and start solo careers. They remain great friends and left open the possibility of reuniting.

In 2009, they released "Reanuedo", a greatest hits album. The album had thirteen tracks, recorded between 2002 and 2006.

=== 2015-present: Reunion and Una Última Vez ===
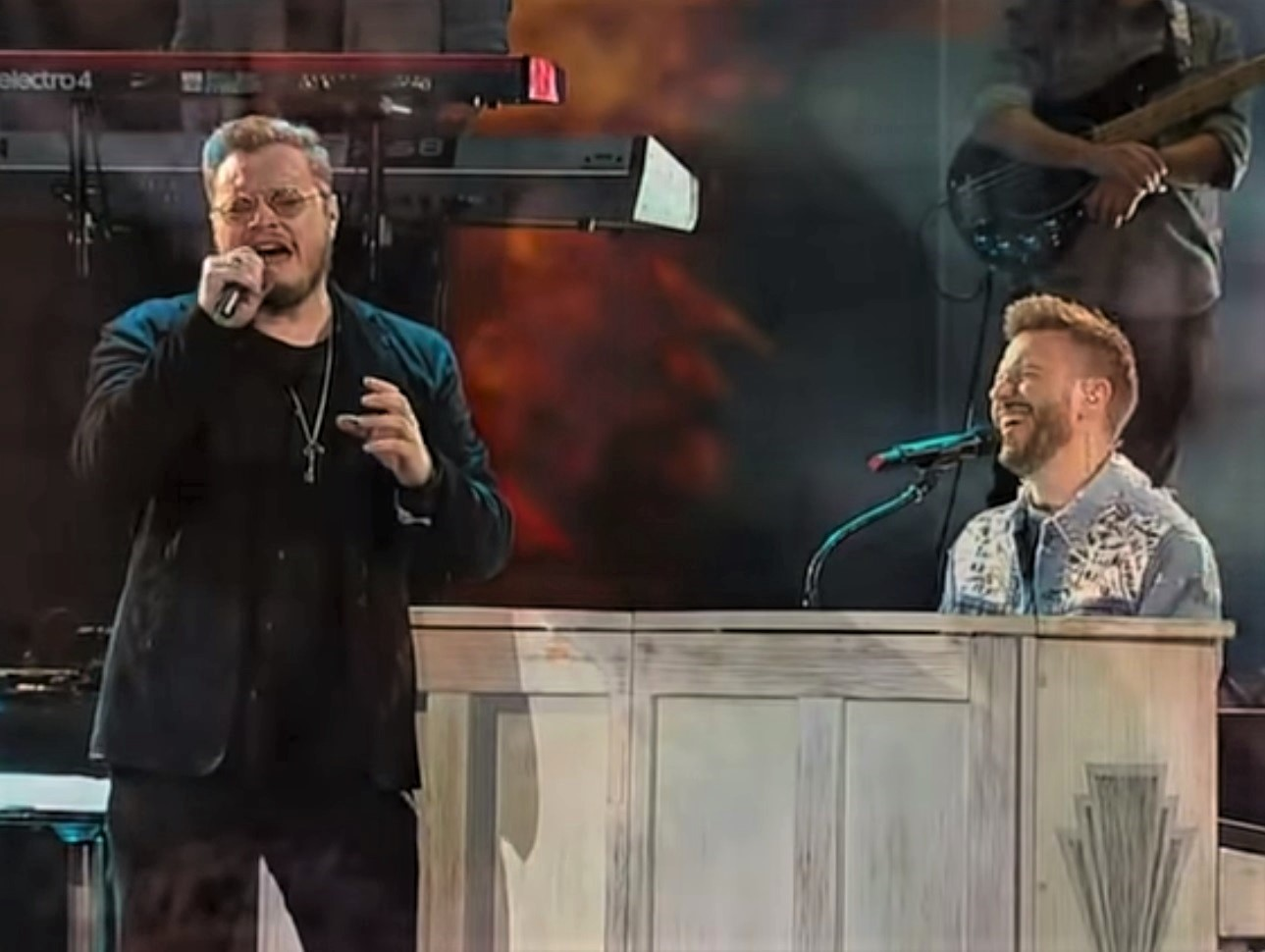
Sin Bandera performing at Viña del Mar International Song Festival in 2017

The duo's fifth studio album and first EP, Una Última Vez, was released on February 5, 2016.

On November 12, 2021, Sin Bandera released a single titled "Ahora Sé" ("Now I Know"). The duo planned to release a sixth album in 2022.

== Discography ==
=== Studio albums ===
Title	Album details
Sin Bandera	Released: November 20, 2001; Singles: "Entra en mi Vida" #1 (MEX); "Kilómetros" #3 (MEX); "Sirena" #1 (MEX); "Te vi Venir" #7 (MEX)
De Viaje	Released: October 21, 2003; Singles: "Mientes tan Bien" #1 (MEX); "Que Lloro" #2 (MEX); "Amor Real" #10 (MEX); "Magia" #38 (MEX); "Si La Ves" #7 (MEX)
Mañana	Released: November 22, 2005; Singles: "Suelta mi Mano" #1 (MEX); "Que me Alcance la Vida" #7 (MEX); "Tocame"; "Junto a Ti"
Pasado	Released: November 14, 2006; Singles: "Si Tú No Estás Aqui" #2 (MEX); "Será" #7 (MEX)

=== Compilations ===
Title	Album details
Hasta Ahora	Released: December 4, 2007; Singles: "Pero No"
Reanuedo	Released: 2009

=== Extended plays ===
Title	Album details
Una Última Vez	Released: February 5, 2016; Singles: "En ésta no"; "Para siempre... tal vez"; "Sobre mí (feat. Maluma)"

=== Billboard charts ===
https://www.billboard.com/artist/sin-bandera/chart-history/htl/

- "Mientes tan bien" (#1)
- "Entra en mi vida" (#3)
- "Que lloró" (#5)
- "Suelta mi mano" (#6)
- "Kilometros" (#16)
- "De viaje" (#18)
- "Si tú no estás" (#18)
- "Que me alcance la vida" (#19)
- "Será" (#28)
- "En esta no" (#32)
- "Sirena" (#43)
- "Para siempre... tal vez" (#48)
