= Donnie Klang =

American singer (born 1985)

- Born: Donald Joseph Klang; January 23, 1985 (age 41); Brooklyn, New York, U.S.
- Genres: Pop; R&B
- Occupation: Singer
- Years active: 2005–present
- Labels: Bad Boy, Eight72, Twenty Two

Donald Joseph Klang (born January 23, 1985) is an American singer. He won Making the Band 4 and was awarded his own solo contract by Diddy. He released his debut album, Just a Rolling Stone, in late 2008.

== Life and career ==
Klang was born in Brooklyn, New York. He began modeling as a baby and doing television and film work from a young age, getting minor roles on NYPD Blue to The Nanny. He was in a band in middle school, later attending chorus in high school. He was part of pop groups in St. Dominic High School and Island Trees High School, namely Playa Deception and INT. The latter which released an independent record called Hip-Pop. He attended Hofstra University briefly studying music management and business and minoring in music. Klang decided to take a semester off of college to pursue a music career with his group.

Klang had been in INT for nine years before it broke up because their parents wanted them to go back to school as the band was going nowhere. He auditioned for American Idol twice but never got past the first round. These events led to him being apprehensive of pursuing music further. Not long after returning to Hofstra and working at a warehouse, the opportunity came for Making the Band 4 and he again took time off from college in 2007. An acquaintance had entered his MySpace account into an audition which he later attended at the encouragement of his family. He was awarded his own solo contract by Diddy instead of a spot in the group. Klang released his debut album, Just a Rolling Stone, in late 2008 which peaked at number nineteen on the Billboard 200. He later opened for Janet Jackson in the fall.

Klang split with Bad Boy Records in mid-2010, signing with independent label Eight72 Entertainment. He began working on his second album at the same time. He later started his own record label, Donnie Klang Entertainment and released his first single "Falling 4U" in 2011. He also released a mixtape on Valentine's Day. "X-Miss" was also released as a single for Christmas in 2011.

== Artistry ==
Klang has listed Boyz II Men, Dru Hill, NSYNC, Backstreet Boys, Usher, The Fray, OneRepublic, Justin Timberlake, Brian McKnight, Michael Jackson and James Brown as musical influences. He co-wrote most of Just a Rolling Stone.

== Discography ==
=== Studio albums ===
Year	Album details	Peak chart positions
Year	Album details	US
2008	Just a Rolling Stone: Released: September 2, 2008; Label: Bad Boy Records; Format: CD, digital download	19

=== Singles ===
Year	Single	Album
2008	"Take You There" (featuring Diddy)	Just a Rolling Stone

=== Music videos ===
Year	Song	Director
2008	"Take You There"	Ray Kay
2009	"Prisoner Of Love"	Littles
2011	"Falling 4U"	Michael Dispenza
2011	"X-Miss"	Kraze

Preceded by Danity Kane	Making the Band winners 2007	Most recent
