= David J. Keyes =

American blues bassist (died 2019)

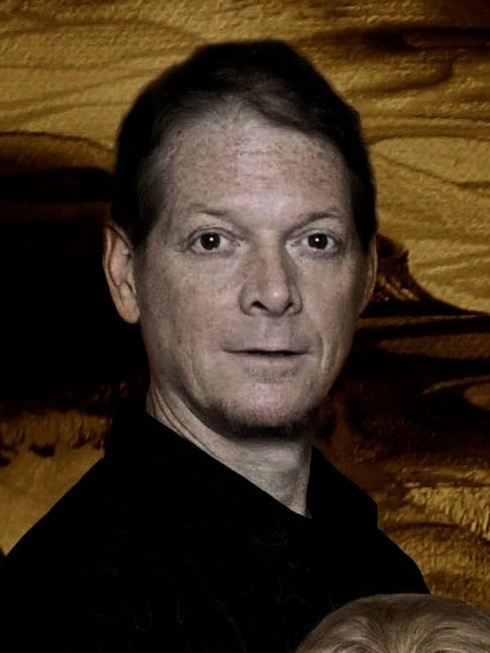
- Keyes in 2012

Background information
- Born: 1954 or 1955; Peoria, Illinois, US
- Died: July 9, 2019 (aged 64)
- Instrument(s): Bass, vocals
- Years active: 1980s–2019
- Formerly of: Renaissance

David J. Keyes (died July 9, 2019) was an American bassist. He worked with the likes of Renaissance and Willy DeVille.

== Biography ==
Keyes was born in Peoria, Illinois to a family of eight siblings; six brothers and two sisters. As an adult, he and his wife, Marilyn, moved to New Jersey where his took off, performing with many local artists and bands.

David received a phone call from a friend who told him Willy DeVille was looking for a new bass player. After a jam session with DeVille and the band, he was brought on as their new bassist, Keyes would play with Willy DeVille from 1992 to 2006. Keyes joined Renaissance for a year in 2001, and returned in 2009. He left in 2015 when his health worsened.

Keyes was diagnosed with Leiomyosarcoma in 2007. He succumb to this illness twelve years later on July 9, 2019. He was 64. He died in Sarasota, Florida, where he and his wife had moved too a year before. His funeral was in his home city of Peoria on August 10, 2019.

== Discography ==
Willy DeVille

- Big Easy Fantasy (1995)
- Loup Garou (1995)
- Horse of a Different Color (1999)
- Crow Jane Alley (2004)

Renaissance

- In the Land of the Rising Sun: Live in Japan 2001 (2002)
- The Mystic and the Muse (2010)
- Grandine il vento (2013)
