= Acoustic Trio Live in Berlin =

Acoustic Trio in Berlin

Live album by Willy DeVille
- Released: November 22, 2002
- Recorded: Columbia Hall, Berlin and Berns, Stockholm
- Genre: Blues, Country, Roots Rock, R&B, Soul, Americana
- Length: 121:25
- Label: Eagle

Willy DeVille chronology
Horse of a Different Color (1999)	Acoustic Trio in Berlin (2002)	Crow Jane Alley (2004)

Professional ratings
Review scores
Source	Rating
Allmusic	3/5 stars

Acoustic Trio Live in Berlin is a 2002 album by Willy DeVille. The album consists of concert recordings made in Berlin to celebrate DeVille’s 25 years of performing, and concert recordings made in Stockholm. Buscadero, the Italian music magazine, named Acoustic Trio Live in Berlin one of the top-ten albums of 2002 in its critics' poll; its readers' poll named the album the 21st best album of 2002.

For the Berlin concerts, DeVille brought along a stripped-down version of his band which he named "The Acoustic Trio.” The Trio consisted of Willy DeVille, Seth Farber, and David J. Keyes. For the Stockholm recordings, DeVille played with an expanded band—the Mink DeVille Band—that included guitarist Freddy Koella, double bassist David J. Keyes, percussionist Boris Kinberg, and background vocalists Doreen and Yadonna Wise.

Richard Marcus called the album "…a great example of not just Willy's talents as a songwriter, but as an interpreter of songs." He added, "A combination of his world-weary voice and the genuine emotion he seems to be able to invest in any song he sings are certainly a good part of why he is successful where others fail, but there's more to it than that. The intangible quality of having looked into the darker part of your soul and come out the other side with your spirit intact that can't be taught, only experienced, is always present when he performs.”

Acoustic Trio Live in Berlin presents cover versions of blues, country, R&B, rock, and soul songs, as well as Willy DeVille originals. It is the second live album by Willy DeVille, the previous live album being 1993’s Willy DeVille Live. Many of the songs on this album also appear in the concert film The Berlin Concerts.

== Track listing ==
=== Disc 1 ===
Recorded March 21, 2002 at Columbia Hall, Berlin.

1. "St. Peter's Street" (Seth Farber) – 2:07
2. "Betty and Dupree" (Chuck Willis) – 5:03
3. "It's Too Late She's Gone" (Chuck Willis) – 4:00
4. "Spanish Harlem" (Jerry Leiber, Phil Spector) – 4:08
5. "Trouble in Mind" (Richard M. Jones) – 3:29
6. "Storybook Love" (Willy DeVille) – 4:23
7. "Big Blue Diamonds" (Earl J. Carson) – 4:21
8. "Shake Sugaree" (Elizabeth Cotton) – 4:50
9. "Let It Be Me" (Gilbert Bécaud, Mann Curtis, Pierre Delanoë) – 4:13
10. "That Is the Way to Make a Broken Heart" (John Hiatt) – 4:48 [should be: "The Way We Make a Broken Heart"]
11. "Hound Dog" (Jerry Leiber, Mike Stoller) – 2:44
12. "Junker's Blues" (Champion Jack Dupree; traditional) – 3:51
13. "You Better Move On" (Arthur Alexander) – 4:05
14. Night Falls" (Willy DeVille) – 4:46
15. "Since I Met You Baby" (Joe Hunter) – 3:51
16. "Heaven Stood Still" (Willy DeVille) – 3:55

=== Disc 2 ===
Tracks 1 through 4 recorded at Columbia Hall, Berlin; tracks 5 through 12 recorded March 10, 2002 at Berns, Stockholm with The Mink DeVille Band.

1. "I'm Blue So Blue" (Clark) – 4:07 (This song is actually "I'll Make It All Up To You", written by Charlie Rich and first recorded by Jerry Lee Lewis in 1958)
2. "Keep a Knocking/Sea Cruise" (Little Richard/Huey Smith) – 4:11
3. "Shake, Rattle and Roll" (Charles E. Calhoun) – 5:05
4. "Rambling on My Mind" (Robert Johnson) – 7:21
5. "One Night of Sin" (Dave Bartholomew, Pearl King, Anita Steiman) – 2:52
6. "Steady Drivin' Man" (Willy DeVille) – 6:03
7. "Goin' Over the Hill" (Fred McDowell) – 3:26
8. "Bamboo Road" (Willy DeVille) – 5:45
9. "Who's Gonna Shoe Your Pretty Little Foot" (traditional) – 5:03
10. "Carmelita" (Warren Zevon) – 4:41
11. "All by Myself" (Dave Bartholomew, Fats Domino) – 3:10
12. "Billy the Kid" (Bob Dylan) – 5:08

Note: The concert in Stockholm cannot have been on June 24, 2002, because Willy DeVille performed at the Metropol in Berlin on that day (cf. the 2009 double DVD The Legendary Berlin Concerts - In Memoriam 1950-2009 (e-m-s - The DVD Company). The precise date for the Stockholm show at Berns is March 10, 2002.

== Personnel ==
=== Acoustic Trio (Berlin concert recordings) ===
- Willy DeVille – vocals, dobro, guitar, harmonica
- Seth Farber – piano, background vocals
- David J. Keyes – double bass, background vocals

=== The Mink DeVille Band (Stockholm concert recordings) ===
- Willy DeVille – vocals, dobro, guitar, harmonica
- David J. Keyes – double bass, background vocals
- Boris Kinberg – percussion
- Freddy Koella – guitar, mandolin, violin
- Dorene Wise – background vocals
- YaDonna Wise – background vocals
