= Victory Mixture =

Studio album by Willy DeVille
- Released: January 1, 1990 (France); December 28, 1990 (U.S.)
- Studios: Sea Saint (New Orleans, Louisiana)
- Genres: R&B, Blues, Soul
- Length: 32:12
- Labels: Sky Ranch (France); Orleans Records (U.S.)
- Producer: Carlo Ditta

Willy DeVille chronology
Miracle (1987)	Victory Mixture (1990)	Backstreets of Desire (1992)

Professional ratings
Review scores
Source	Rating
Allmusic	4/5 stars

Victory Mixture is a 1990 album by Willy DeVille. The album consists of cover versions of New Orleans R&B and soul classics by DeVille’s musical idols. Trouser Press said about the album, “A rootsy covers collection, Victory Mixture provides a welcome antidote to Miracle's misguided modernity, making the most of the singer's relocation to New Orleans with backup from such local legends as Allen Toussaint, Eddie Bo and Dr. John.”

Victory Mixture is unusual in that it was recorded without the use of overdubbing or sound editing, the idea being to record the songs in the same manner as they were recorded originally in the 1950s and early 1960s — without soundboard technology.

The album was released in Europe on the French Sky Ranch label; it was released a year later in the United States on the Orleans Records label, that label's second offering. The success of Victory Mixture in Europe ensured the label's continuing operation.

== Origins of Victory Mixture ==
In 1988, Willy DeVille relocated from New York to New Orleans. He told Leap in the Dark: "I was tired of being 'Willy DeVille,' walking out of my building and having to be the guy who was up on stage all the time, even when I wasn't performing. I wanted to get away from that. So I got down there (to New Orleans) and it was as if this famous guy had come to town, and I didn't want that. So I decided to do an album with a bunch of the musicians from down there, the music of New Orleans."

DeVille told Sheila Rene about the beginnings of Victory Mixture:

A friend of mine (Carlo Ditta) who owns Orleans Records here in New Orleans approached me with the idea of working with him on a Delta record, a blues record where you just play acoustic and do what you want to do. There's so much good material here in New Orleans from the early 50s and 60s, and he still had a box of 45s. We went through them, and there were all these hit records that weren't hit records; maybe regional hits by artists from New Orleans. I picked out the stuff that worked with my voice.

I got all the original guys to come back in, like Earl King, Dr. John and Eddie Bo. Allen Toussaint played side piano. I brought in the rhythm section of The Meters on a couple of cuts. We call it the "little" record. It's funny, because I was just trying to get them money, the writers of the songs, 'cause they all got ripped off in the 50s and 60s. They were all fascinated, and Dr. John convinced them that they wouldn't get ripped off by this northern white boy. That's when I crossed over to being a local here in New Orleans.

We were all pleased with it. It's recorded the way it was originally done back then. It's live with no overdubs anywhere, no digital, no editing. We played the song several times and just picked the best take...the one that was the most natural.

Producer Carlo Ditta described the birth of the album this way:

Back in New Orleans I got the word that Willy DeVille was living in town and asking after me. I showed up with my latest CDs, including my Guitar Slim Jr. Grammy nomination, and convinced him that I needed to produce a reverse-crossover roots record on him. I played him a bunch of my old New Orleans R&B 45s, including sides by Ernie K-Doe, Earl King, Irma Thomas, Huey Smith and the Pitter Pats, Oliver Morgan, and Champion Jack Dupree, and with the help of Allen Toussaint, Dr. John, Leo Nocentelli, George Porter, Kerry Brown and a host of other local talent, we crafted an album at Sea Saint Studios titled Victory Mixture. I licensed it to my old friend, Phillippe LeBras, and he put it out in France on his new label, Sky Ranch. It sold over 100,000 units in Europe very quickly—our first gold disc.

== "New Orleans Revue" Tour ==
In the summer of 1992, DeVille toured Europe with Dr John, Johnny Adams, Zachary Richard, and The Wild Magnolias as part of his "New Orleans Revue" tour. He told Leap in the Dark, "The travel, buses, and planes and the accommodations had to be some of the worst I've ever experienced, but the shows themselves were great. At the end of each show we'd throw Mardi Gras rows out to the audience, you know strands of purple and gold beads, and they'd never seen anything like it and they loved it.”

== Other information ==
Victory Mixture was produced by Carlo Ditta, the founder of Orleans Records. Ditta met DeVille in 1980 when DeVille was touring with Mink DeVille, and Ditta joined the band in an after-hours jam session at the Beat Exchange, a New Orleans punk rock hangout.

This album was the first time DeVille recorded with guitarist Freddy Koëlla (credited on this album as Frèdèrick Koella), who would record and tour with DeVille for many years to come. The two were introduced by guitarmaker James Trussart. Said DeVille, "I adore (Trussart). He made my guitar and introduced me to my guitarist, Fred. A fabulous guitarist. He can play like Ry Cooder, he can play the Spanish style... He knows it all, his play is very subtle, very sophisticated. On stage I always have to tell him to play louder; he's afraid of stepping on me. That's a good guitarist. I'd like to play more the guitar, the slide particularly, but when I listen to him I stay paralyzed." Koella played in Bob Dylan's backup band in 2003 and 2004.

Victory Mixture was also the first time DeVille sang with background vocalists Dorene and Yadonna Wise, who would tour with DeVille in The Mink DeVille band in years to come. Allen Toussaint introduced the Wise sisters to DeVille.

The songs "Teasing You," "Beating Like a Tom-Tom," and ”Who Shot the La-La” can also be heard on DeVille's Big Easy Fantasy album (1995). The songs have slightly different horn and background-vocal arrangements.

== Track listing ==
1. “Hello My Lover” (Clarence Toussaint) - 3:33
2. “It Do Me Good” (Huey Smith, Brenda Brandon) - 3:06
3. ”Key to My Heart” (Edwin Bocage) - 3:38
4. ”Beating Like a Tom-Tom” (Ernest Kador) - 4:21
5. ”Every Dog Has Its Day” (Edwin Bocage) - 2:38
6. ”Big Blue Diamonds” (Earl "Kit" Carson) - 2:51
7. ”Teasin' You” (Earl King) - 3:07
8. ”Ruler of My Heart” (Naomi Neville) - 2:42
9. ”Who Shot the La-La” (D. Burmak, Edwin Bocage, Theresa Terry) - 2:57
10. ”Junker's Blues” (Willie Hall) - 3:19

== Personnel ==
- Wayne Bennett – guitar
- Samuel Berfect – Hammond organ
- Eddie Bo – piano
- Isaac Bolden - piano
- Ross Brady – background vocals
- Kerry Brown – drums
- Rene Coman – bass guitar, upright bass
- Brian "Breeze" Coyolle - tenor sax, baritone sax
- Willy DeVille - guitar, vocals
- Keith Fazarde – vibraphone
- Barbara George – background vocals
- Bill Gregory - guitar
- Porgy Jones - trumpet
- Frèdèrick Koella - guitar
- Allison Miner – background vocals
- Leo Nocentelli - guitar
- George Porter Jr. - bass guitar
- Mac Rebennack (Dr. John) - piano
- Allen Toussaint - piano
- Johnny Vidacovich - drums
- Dorene Wise - background vocals
- YaDonna Wise – background vocals

=== Production ===
- Roger Branch – engineer
- Carlo Ditta – producer
- Mark Hewitt - engineer
- Barry Kaiser - photography
- Owen Murphy - photography
- Hank Waring – digital remastering
