= Streamline Ewing =

- Birth name: John Richard Ewing
- Born: January 19, 1917; Topeka, Kansas
- Died: February 1, 2002 (aged 85); Pasadena, California
- Genres: Jazz
- Occupation: Musician
- Instrument: Trombone

John Richard "Streamline" Ewing (January 19, 1917 – February 1, 2002) was an American jazz trombonist.

== Career ==
In 1934, Ewing began his career when he was seventeen. Four years later he was with Horace Henderson, then with Earl Hines live and on record from 1938 to 1939 and from 1941 to 1942. He worked for short spans with Louis Armstrong and Lionel Hampton in the 1940s, in addition to Jimmie Lunceford (1943–45), Cab Calloway (1946, 1949), Jay McShann (1948), Cootie Williams (1950), Louis Jordan, and Earl Bostic.

In the early 1950s he moved to California and played with George Jenkins and in the studio with T-Bone Walker and Gerald Wilson. He began playing with Teddy Buckner in 1956; the two would play together on and off into the 1980s. He led his band the Streamliners for recording sessions in 1958 and 1960. In 1962 he toured with Henderson again and with Rex Stewart in 1967. Late in the 1960s he played in the Young Men of New Orleans band.

In 1983 he played with the Eagle Brass Band and recorded with Johnny Otis in 1990. He played on two Willy DeVille albums: Backstreets of Desire (1992) and Big Easy Fantasy (1995).

== Discography ==
=== As sideman ===
With Gerald Wilson

- You Better Believe It! (Pacific Jazz, 1961)
- Portraits (Pacific Jazz, 1964)
- On Stage (Pacific Jazz, 1965)
- Feelin' Kinda Blues (Pacific Jazz, 1965)
- The Golden Sword (Pacific Jazz, 1966)

With others

- Hoyt Axton, Saturday's Child (Horizon, 1963)
- Hoyt Axton, Hoyt Axton Sings Bessie Smith (Exodus, 1965)
- David Bromberg, Midnight On the Water (CBS, 1975)
- Roy Brown, Hard Times (Bluesway, 1973)
- Bobby Bryant, Earth Dance World (Pacific Jazz, 1969)
- Teddy Buckner, Frank Bull and Gene Norman Present...Teddy Buckner and His Dixieland Band (Dixieland Jubilee, 1957)
- Teddy Buckner, On the Sunset Strip (GNP Crescendo, 1961)
- Red Callender, Swingin' Suite (Modern, 1956)
- Red Callender, The Lowest (MetroJazz, 1958)
- Papa John Creach, Filthy! (Grunt, 1972)
- Willy DeVille, Backstreets of Desire (EastWest, 1992)
- Judy Henske, Judy Henske (Elektra, 1963)
- Judy Henske, High Flying Bird (Elektra, 1963)
- Z. Z. Hill, Keep On Lovin' You (United Artists, 1975)
- Earl Hines, The Father Jumps (Bluebird, 1975)
- Lightnin' Hopkins, Something Blue (Verve, 1967)
- B.B. King, Lucille (Bluesway, 1968)
- Danny O'Keefe, The Global Blues (Warner Bros., 1979)
- Johnny Otis, Good Lovin' Blues (Ace, 1990)
- Johnny Otis, Spirit of the Black Territory Bands (Arhoolie, 1992)
- Googie Rene, Romesville! (Class, 1959)
- Diana Ross, Lady Sings the Blues (Motown, 1972)
- Ike & Tina Turner, River Deep Mountain High (London, 1966)
- Bob Thiele, Head Start (Flying Dutchman, 1969)
- T-Bone Walker, Stormy Monday Blues (Bluesway, 1968)
- Charles Wright, Rhythm and Poetry (Warner Bros., 1972)
