= William Coupon =

American photographer (1952–2026)

William Coupon

William Coupon (December 3, 1952 – May 29, 2026) was an American photographer, known principally for his formal painterly backdrop portraits of tribal people, politicians and celebrities.

== Life and career ==
William Coupon was born in New York City, but moved to Washington, D.C., and later to San Francisco. He attended Syracuse University and ultimately moved to New York City to begin his photographic career. Coupon began in 1979 to photograph backdrop portraits of New York’s youth culture, to document its “New Wave/Punk” scene at the then popular Mudd Club in lower Manhattan. Commercial work soon followed for a variety of international magazines, record companies and advertising agencies. He continued to photograph portraits, often of various sub-cultures and indigenous peoples in the 1980s and early 1990s including Haitians, Florida State Prison inmates, Australian Aboriginals, Drag Queens, Alaska Natives, Sámi people in Scandinavia, Turkish Kurds, Israeli Druze, the traditional Dutch, Moroccan Berbers, New Guinea tribesmen, Brazilian Caraja, Malaysian Penan, Native Americans, and the Mexican Lacandon, Huichol, Mennonite and Tarahumara. These were titled his “Social Studies” series. He was invited to photograph the world’s tribal leaders during the Earth Summit in May 1992, in Rio de Janeiro, Brazil. His most current work embraces the digital medium, in places like Cuba, Venezuela and in his native America, which is more candid, but still formalistic in approach.

The portrait style is up-close and painterly, with very warm earth tones against a mottled canvas. The style is usually medium-shot and classically lit using medium format cameras, referencing the Dutch painting masters such as Rembrandt and Holbein. The portraits have a quality about them that is less about fashion than about personality and as groups there is attempt to show their disparity as well what is relatable among the earth's faces in a manner that is real, non-compromising, or over-glamorized. They were often accompanied by environmental images, which have a noticeably journalistic feel. Some of his most notable images are of the Presidents George W. Bush and Bill Clinton which were “Person of the Year” covers for Time Magazine, Yasser Arafat, George Harrison, Willy DeVille, Mick Jagger, Jean-Michel Basquiat and Miles Davis.

Coupon was featured in the Visual Collaborative Polaris catalog, under the Supernova series for humanities, he was interviewed alongside people such as; Nse Ikpe-Etim, Xárene Eskandar and Nere Teriba.

Coupon died from cancer on May 30, 2026, at the age of 73.

== Sources ==
- Hager, Steven, "Art After Midnight, The East Village Scene", New York, St. Martin's Press, 1986
