= Loup Garou (album) =

Studio album by Willy DeVille
- Released: November 4, 1995 (Europe); June 18, 1996 (U.S.)
- Recorded: The Nut Ranch, Studio City; Room & Board, Nashville; Schnee Studio, North Hollywood; Track Studio, North Hollywood
- Genre: Country, Blues, Cajun, Mariachi, R&B, Soul
- Length: 54:51
- Label: EastWest (Europe); Discovery (U.S.)
- Producer: John Philip Shenale; Willy DeVille

Willy DeVille chronology
Big Easy Fantasy (1995)	Loup Garou (1995)	Horse of a Different Color (1999)

Loup Garou (French for werewolf) is an album released in 1995 by Willy DeVille. First released in Europe in 1995 on the EastWest label, it was released the following year in the United States on the Discovery label. It was recorded in Los Angeles and produced by John Philip Shenale, who also produced DeVille’s Backstreets of Desire album.

== Duet with Brenda Lee ==
Loup Garou includes a duet with Brenda Lee (“You’ll Never Know”). DeVille said about recording with Lee:

She’s amazing, and so professional. She's just this tiny little woman who has this great big voice. I had to cool out her accent a little bit. She had a real cracker-type of accent. I guess it's gotten thicker over the years, because she didn't sound like that when she was a teenager doing "Sweet Nothing."

She didn't know who the hell I was. I just called her up, played the song for her, and she loved it. She had her business people check me out, and they reported that I was big in Europe and had been recording for twenty years. So I flew to Nashville, which is a very weird place. Everybody is in the music business—every cab driver, waiter and busboy.

She was very shy. I thought she didn't like me at first, but once she got into the studio and saw me with all my dogs, she realized I was a very normal person. I told her I'd seen every show she ever did in New Orleans. I was the guy in front, and I had a picture of her sitting on my lap. I had my proof. That's got to go down in my book as one of the most memorable experiences in my career.

== Reviews ==
Professional ratings
Review scores
Source	Rating
Allmusic	3/5 stars

Allmusic's 2008 capsule review says, “With Loup Garou, Willie DeVille explored new rhythmic and melodic territory, experimenting with cajun and mariachi music. Not all of the songs work—frequently, Deville sounds too nervous and studied to really break free and have fun with the material—but it nevertheless is enjoyable, with enough strong songs (especially ‘You’ll Never Know,’ a duet with Brenda Lee) to make it worthwhile for longtime DeVille followers.”

The album received at least two favorable reviews at the time of its release. Musician said, “Loup Garou is subtle in nuance but staggering in scope; it connects the dots between all of the artist’s sacrosanct influences, often within the framework of a single song … All of it is on the money, performed from the heart.”

The Independent said, “(Deville’s) voice has, if anything, improved with the husky patina of age. Loup Garou builds on his trademark sub-Springsteen style, adding a few Louisiana voodoo touches where appropriate, particularly on the title track, and blending in other, more unusual textures, like the fairground sound of the Optigan keyboard on ‘Still (I Love You Still).’ He comes close to poignancy-overload on ‘Angels Don't Lie,’ where wistful uilleann pipes and penny-whistle are combined with the haunting string-pad sound from ‘Streets of Philadelphia,’ but there's enough skill and sensitivity elsewhere to render this a more than capable comeback.”

== Other information ==
While DeVille wrote most of Loup Garou in his native English, some songs have lyrics in Cajun French, and “Asi Te Amo” is a Spanish language reprise of the track “Still (I Love You Still).” "No Such Pain as Love" presents a rare country music offering by DeVille. Freddy Koella, a longtime DeVille sideman, cowrote "When You're Away from Me."

The cover photograph shows DeVille standing in front of Jean Lafitte's Blacksmith Shop, said to be the oldest bar in the United States, at the corner of Bourbon Street and St. Philip Street in New Orleans.

DeVille, his then-wife Lisa, and Mink DeVille Band members Koella, David J. Keyes, Seth Farber, Boris Kinberg, and Shawn Murray appeared in a music video for "Still (I Love You Still)," filmed in spring 1995 at the New Orleans Preservation Hall.

== Track listing ==
Unless otherwise noted, all songs by Willy DeVille.

1. “No Such Pain as Love“ - 3:43
  - Willy DeVille on vocals, Freddy Koella on violin, Brian Ray on guitar, John Philip Shenale on keyboards, David Faragher on bass, Michael Urbano on drums
2. “Runnin' Through the Jungle (Shootin' the Blues)“ - 3:44
  - Willy DeVille on vocals; Chris Spedding, Freddy Koella, and Brian Ray on guitars; David Faraghar on bass; Michael Urbano on drums and percussion; John Philip Shenale on optigan; Efrain Toro on shaker
3. “When You're Away from Me“ – (Willy DeVille, Freddy Koella) - 5:29
  - Willy DeVille on vocals; Freddy Koella and Brian Ray on guitar; John Phillip Shenale on keyboards; David Faragher on bass; Michael Urbano on drums; Efraian Toro on slit drum, Billy Valentine and James Gilstrap on background vocals
4. “Angels Don't Lie“ - 5:07
  - Willy DeVille on vocals; Brian Ray on guitar, Freddy Koella on violin, John Philip Shenale on keyboards, David Faragher on bass, Michael Urbano on drums, Hunter Lee on penny whistle and uilleann pipes, Siobhan Maher on background vocals
5. “Still (I Love You Still)“ - 4:07
  - Willy DeVille on vocals, Freddy Koella and Brian Ray on guitar; John Philip Shenale on keyboards; David Faragher on bass; Michael Urbano on drums; Efrain Toro on castanets, woodclaps, and guiro; Jesús Guzmán and Salvador Hernandez on trumpet
6. “White Trash Girl“ - 3:34
  - Willy DeVille on vocals; Freddy Koella and Brian Ray on guitar; John Philip Shenale on keyboards; David Faragher on bass; Michael Urbano on drums
7. “You'll Never Know“ - 3:43
  - Willy DeVille and Brenda Lee on vocals; Freddy Koella and Brian Ray on guitar; John Philip Shenale on keyboards; David Faragher on bass; Michael Urbano on drums
8. “Ballad of the Hoodlum Priest“ - 4:16
  - Willy DeVille on vocals;, Freddy Koella, Brian Ray, and David J. Keyes on guitar; John Philip Shenale on keyboards; David Faragher on bass; Michael Urbano on drums, Efrain Toro on percussion; David J. Keyes, Billy Valentine, John Denham, and Will Wheaton on background vocals
9. “Heart of a Fool“ - 4:07
  - Willy DeVille on vocals; Chris Spedding and Brian Ray on guitars; Freddy Koella on mandolin; David Faragher on bass; Michael Urbano on drums and percussion; John Philip Shenale on keyboards; Ismael Gallegos on accordion; Billy Valentine, John Denham, and Will Wheaton on background vocals
10. “Asi Te Amo“ - 4:06
  - Willy DeVille on vocals, Freddy Koella and Brian Ray on guitar; John Philip Shenale on keyboards; David Faragher on bass; David J. Keyes on backing vocals; Michael Urbano on drums; Efrain Toro on castanets, wood claps, and guiro; Jesús Guzmán and Salvador Hernandez on trumpet
11. “Loup Garou ‘Bal Goula’” - 4:50
  - Willy DeVille on vocals; Freddy Koella and Brian Ray on guitar; John Philip Shenale on keyboards; David Faragher on bass; Michael Urbano on drums; Billy Valentine, John Denham, Will Wheaton, and Dixie Belle on background vocals; John Phillip Shenale and Pete Magdelano on vocal effects
12. “Time Has Come Today“ – (Joe Chambers, Willie Chambers) - 4:07
  - Willy DeVille on vocals, Freddy Koella and Brian Ray on guitar; John Philip Shenale on keyboards; David Faragher on bass; Michael Urbano on drums; Efrain Toro on percussion; John Phillip Shenale on background vocals
13. “My One Desire (Vampire's Lullaby)“ - 4:04
  - Willy DeVille on vocals; Freddy Koella and Brian Ray on guitar; John Philip Shenale on keyboards; David Faragher on bass; Michael Urbano on drums; Nancy Stein-Ross and Ernie Erhardt on cello; James Ross on viola; Scott Smalley as conductor

== Personnel ==
- Dixie Belle - background vocals (“Loup Garou ‘Bal Goula’”)
- John Denham - background vocals (“Ballad of the Hoodlum Priest“)("Heart of a Fool")(“Loup Garou ‘Bal Goula’”)
- Willy DeVille - vocals
- Ernie Erhardt - cello (“My One Desire [Vampire's Lullaby]“)
- David Faragher - bass
- Ismael Gallegos - accordion ("Heart of a Fool")
- Jim Gilstrap - background vocals (“Runnin' Through the Jungle [Shootin' the Blues])“
- Jesús Guzmán - trumpet (“Still [I Love You Still],“ "Asi Te Amo")
- Salvador Hernandez - trumpet (“Still [I Love You Still],“ "Asi Te Amo")
- David J. Keyes - guitar (on “Ballad of the Hoodlum Priest“), background vocals, ("Asi Te Amo", "Still [I Love You Still]")
- Freddy Koella - guitar, mandolin, violin
- Brenda Lee - vocals (“You’ll Never Know”)
- Hunter Lee - penny whistle, uilleann pipes ("Angels Don't Lie")
- Pete Magdelano - vocal effects (“Loup Garou ‘Bal Goula’”)
- Siobhan Maher - background vocals ("Angels Don't Lie")
- Brian Ray - guitar
- James Ross - viola (“My One Desire [Vampire's Lullaby]“)
- John Philip Shenale - percussion, keyboards, background vocals, optigan
- Chris Spedding - guitar ("Heart of a Fool," "Runnin' Through the Jungle")
- Nancy Stein-Ross - cello (“My One Desire [Vampire's Lullaby]“)
- Efrain Toro - percussion, shakuhachi, castanets, drums, clapping, shaker, güiro, wood clapper
- Michael Urbano - percussion, drums, tambourine, cowbell
- Billy Valentine - background vocals
- Wil Wheaton - background vocals

=== Production ===
- Willy DeVille - producer
- John Carter - mixing ("Loop Garou 'Bal Goula,'" "Ballad of the Hoodlum Priest")
- John Hendrickson - assistant engineer (Schnee Studio)
- John Beverly Jones - recording engineer
- Ray Kennedy - recording engineer
- Kirschstein and partner: cover design
- Pete Magdaleno - assistant engineer (Nut Ranch, Track Record)
- McDermott and McGough - photography
- Raquella Rios - Spanish coach
- Doug Saks – mastering
- Al Schmitt - mixing
- John Philip Shenale - producer
