= Pistola =

Studio album by Willy DeVille
- Released: February 4, 2008
- Recorded: Nut Ranch, Studio City; Mayflower Hotel, New York
- Genre: Roots rock, New Orleans R&B, Tex-Mex, Latin rock
- Length: 43:27
- Label: Eagle
- Producer: John Philip Shenale, Willy DeVille

Willy DeVille chronology
Crow Jane Alley (2004)	Pistola (2008)

Pistola is the last album by Willy DeVille, released on Mardi Gras day 2008 as a nod to DeVille's musical roots in New Orleans. The album was recorded in Los Angeles with Brian Ray, Lon Price, The Valentine Brothers, and other musicians who had played with DeVille for years. For this album, DeVille borrowed bassist Davey Faragher and drummer Pete Thomas from Elvis Costello's backup band, the Imposters (DeVille's band Mink DeVille toured with Elvis Costello in 1978). John Philip Shenale produced the album, his fourth production effort for Willy DeVille.

Said DeVille about his choice of titles for the album: "I wanted (the album) to sound like those old cowboy movies ... Pis–to–la: the sound has that feel of the western, and something hot too. An exciting sound, just like what I hope the music will be for people."

== Reviews ==
Professional ratings
Review scores
Source	Rating
The Independent	4/5 stars

NME said about Pistola, "DeVille's louche fusion of rock 'n' roll, Tex-Mex and country styles has matured with age, and his most recent work is among the finest of his recording career."

Spin said that the album "sees (Willy DeVille) continue his successful partnership with producer John Philip Shenale. The new album finds him once again creating his unique mixture of rock, soul, R&B, blues and Cajun with articulate lyrics and Willy's distinctive vocal style."

Independent Music said about the album:

(Willy DeVille) ... has never been more artistically potent than on Pistola, confronting the demons of his past with an impressive lyrical honesty and unexpectedly diverse musical imagination. DeVille’s beloved New Orleans provides the touchstone for most of the album: the ex-addiction anthem "Been There Done That," for instance, is couched in infectious clavinet funk, while "You Got The World In Your Hands" sounds like Tom Waits covering Dr John's "Gris-Gris." Elsewhere, there are echoes of the Stones, Springsteen and "Spanish Harlem"—all this, and a great version of Paul Siebel's classic "Louise" too. Who would have thought it?

Leap in the Dark praised the album's bold originality: "Pistola is not the type of album you'd expect from as established a performer as Willy DeVille. Most people at his stage in their careers wouldn't be taking the risk of including pieces as unconventional as 'Mountains of Manhattan' and 'Stars that Speak,' but Willy has always marched to the beat of his own drummer. It's that willingness to take risks that keeps his music fresh and alive, and the ten songs on Pistola are no exception."

Andrew Carver said, "DeVille ... is one of those rare artists who seem to have dragged their prime years across the decades, and Pistola is another triumph of experience."

== Other information ==
Critic Thom Jurek said about the song "The Stars that Speak,"This track succeeds in summing up DeVille’s entire mythology and professional persona in lyric form; it is read in his trademark smooth-whiskey-meets-cigarette-smoke voice. It reveals, just under the surface, not only the promise of dim lights, perfume, mystery, and sweat-stained sheets, but a figure whose most prominent feature is the outline of a human heart, cracked and broken over and again, who remains resolute in the notion that love prevails."

== Track listing ==
Unless otherwise noted, all songs by Willy DeVille.

1. "So So Real" – 4:16
  - Willy DeVille on lead vocals, Josh Sklair on acoustic and electric guitars, Pete Thomas on drums and percussion, Davey Faragher on bass and background vocals, John Philip Shenale on piano and synth
2. "Been There Done That" – 4:09
  - Willy DeVille on lead vocals and background vocals; Josh Sklair on electric guitars; Pete Thomas on drums and percussion; Davey Faragher on bass; John Philip Shenale on clavinet, synths, and percussion; Lee Thornburg on trumpet; Andrew Lippman on trombone
3. "When I Get Home" – 3:21
  - Willy DeVille on lead vocal; Brian Ray on acoustic guitar, twelve-string guitar, and strumstick; John Philip Shenale on Chamberlin and orchestra bell; Davey Faragher on background vocals
4. "Louise" (Paul Siebel) – 3:54
  - Willy DeVille on lead vocals, Brian Ray on acoustic and electric guitars, Pete Thomas on drums, Davey Faragher on bass and background vocals, John Philip Shenale on piano, Chris Lawrence on pedal steel guitar
5. "The Band Played On" – 4:42
  - Willy DeVille on lead vocal, Brian Ray on acoustic and electric guitars, Pete Thomas on drums, Davey Faragher on bass, John Philip Shenale on piano and percussion, Lon Price on clarinet, Lee Thornburg on trumpet, Andrew Lippman on trombone, Billy Valentine on background vocals, John Valentine on background vocals, Charles Valentino on background vocals
6. "You Got the World in Your Hands" – 4:04
  - Willy DeVille on lead vocals and background vocals; Josh Sklair on electric guitars; Pete Thomas on drums and percussion; Davey Faragher on bass; John Philip Shenale on Wurly, synths, and percussion; Amanda Dumas on background vocals; Marta Woodhull on background vocals
7. "I Remember the First Time" – 4:08
  - Willy DeVille on lead vocal; Josh Sklair on acoustic and electric guitars; Pete Thomas on drums and percussion; Davey Faragher on bass; John Philip Shenale on piano, synths, and percussion; Billy Valentine on background vocals; John Valentine on background vocals; Charles Valentino on background vocals
8. "Stars that Speak" – 5:19
  - Willy DeVille on lead vocal and slide guitar; John Philip Shenale on piano, Chamberlin, synths, and percussion
9. "I'm Gonna Do Something the Devil Never Did" – 5:45
  - Willy DeVille on lead vocal; Brian Ray on electric guitars; Pete Thomas on drums and percussion; Davey Faragher on bass; John Philip Shenale on fortepiano, synths, and percussion; Billy Valentine on background vocals; John Valentine on background vocals; Charles Valentino on background vocals
10. "The Mountains of Manhattan" – 3:42
  - Willy DeVille on lead vocal and wooden flute, Pete Thomas on percussion, John Philip Shenale on percussion

== Personnel ==
- Willy DeVille – wooden flute, slide guitar, vocals
- Amanda Dumas – background vocals
- Davey Faragher – bass, background vocals
- Chris Lawrence – pedal steel guitar
- Andrew Lippman – trombone
- Lon Price – clarinet, saxophone
- Brian Ray – guitar, strumstick, twelve-string guitar
- John Philip Shenale – Chamberlin, clavinet, fortepiano, orchestra bell, percussion, piano, synthesizer, Wurlitzer
- Josh Sklair – guitar
- Pete Thomas – drums, percussion
- Lee Thornburg – trumpet
- The Valentine Brothers – background vocals
  - Billy Valentine
  - Charles Valentine
- Charles Valentino – background vocals
- Marta Woodhull – background vocals

=== Production ===
- John Carter – engineering, mixing
- William Coupon – photography
- Willy DeVille – producer
- Stuart Green – design
- Ron McMaster – mastering (Capitol Records, Hollywood)
- John Philip Shenale – arrangements, producer, engineering, mixing
