= Backstreets of Desire =

Studio album by Willy DeVille
- Released: October 10, 1992 (Europe); 1994 (United States)
- Recorded: Hot Tin Roof (North Hollywood); The Nut Ranch (Studio City); Ocean Way (Hollywood); One on One (North Hollywood); Pacifique (Los Angeles)
- Genre: Roots rock, New Orleans R&B, Latin rock, Cajun, Tex-Mex, Mariachi
- Length: 57:16
- Label: Fnac Music (Europe); Forward Records (Rhino) (United States)
- Producer: John Philip Shenale; Willy DeVille; Dr. John; Philippe Rault

Willy DeVille chronology
Victory Mixture (1990)	Backstreets of Desire (1992)	Willy DeVille Live (1993)

Backstreets of Desire is an album by Willy DeVille. It was recorded in various Los Angeles recording studios in 1992. To make the album, DeVille was joined by many prominent musicians, including Dr. John, David Hidalgo of Los Lobos, Zachary Richard, Jim Gilstrap, Freebo, Efrain Toro, and Jimmy Zavala.

A novel mariachi version of the Jimi Hendrix standard "Hey Joe" was a hit in Europe. "I did a version of 'Hey Joe' in mariachi-style," DeVille told Sheila Rene. "I talk through the lyrics. It was a big hit for me in Europe—number one in Spain and France." DeVille brought in Mariachi los Camperos, led by Nati Cano, to play on "Hey Joe."

== Reviews ==
Professional ratings
Review scores
Source	Rating
Allmusic	4.5/5 stars

Trouser Press said about the album, "Backstreets of Desire skillfully draws on DeVille's prior genre explorations to create music that's wholly contemporary while remaining true to the artist's original vision."

Critic Thom Jurek of Allmusic considered it one of DeVille's greatest albums:

Backstreets of Desire combined all of DeVille’s prodigious gifts in a deeply focused—though wide-ranging—hour-long program. It’s here in the breathtaking broken-hearted ballad "Empty Heart" (recorded with an orchestra), the street-savvy rock and soul in "All in the Name of Love," the sexual voodoo funk in Willie Mitchell's "Come to Poppa," the skiffle-tinged "Even While I Sleep," the folksy Caribbean-porch-song-meets-Cuban-son in his reading of Billy Roberts' "Hey Joe," or in his own breezy New Orleans-bordello-music-meets-Spanish-folk epic, "Bamboo Road." From the album's cover to its contents, there isn't a weak moment on the disc. It reveals that DeVille, despite the chaos in his life, had become a songwriter and performer in a league of his own. His sell-out performances all over Europe were a signal that this wonderfully complex persona was an "artist" in the popular vernacular and canon.

Randy Krbechek called Backstreets of Desire a "gem of an album just waiting to be found." He added, "When I first heard this album, I thought 'Wow, John Mellencamp remembered how to sing.' Gail thinks it sounds like The Boss. Cheryl thinks it sounds like vintage Bowie. There are also occasional echoes of Pere Ubu. It doesn't matter. The result is one great, driving rock and roll record — the kind of disk that ought to scale the charts."

== Background and Production ==
The album was initially released in Europe in 1992 on the French Fnac Music label; it was released in the United States in 1994 on Rhino's Forward Records label. The album sold well in Europe, but DeVille complained that Rhino did not do enough to promote the album in the United States: "It's really a dumb-ass label. You have to be dead to sell records on that label—black, crippled and blind. Anyway, 'Hey Joe' was too violent for them. This is at the time when all those rap records were getting attention and they were really violent. They're just full of bullshit."

Dr. John produced "Voodoo Charm" and "Jump City"; Philippe Rault produced "Hey Joe"; and John Philip Shenale and Willy DeVille produced the other songs. This was the first time DeVille worked with Shenale, who would later produce several of his albums. DeVille said about Shenale in 2008:

What's great about Phil is he always hears the sound I want to create, and knows how to bring out the best in me in the studio. He's not some hard ass or anything like that, yelling at you, but he keeps it together and makes it work... (Shenale) knows what I want to create — he comes up with ideas that help make the sound right.

There was this one song — it was on Backstreets of Desire I think — where he took a Baby Grand piano, a really good one right, and took the lid off and played on the wires with drum sticks because he knew that was the way to get the sound we needed for the song. He doesn't say, "This is what it has to sound like" or make it into his sound. It's all about finding the sound, or really knowing what I'm hearing inside my head almost, and helping me make it happen.

Producer Philippe Rault said of the album:

His only ever gold album emerged from Los Angeles in 1992 and launched a whole new phase in his professional life, bringing him artistic and financial success that he had never enjoyed before. Not in America of course, but in Europe. This is the town where a great mariachi band, Nati Cano’s ‘Los Camperos,’ helped Willy create a new rendering of ‘Hey Joe,’ which would ignite his prospects in a big way. I had the privilege to produce that record and even though we did not know we had a hit at the time, we sensed something exciting and unique had happened in the studio. The Mexican touch gave a completely new spin to that hackneyed neo-folk song which had peaked in 1967 with Jimi Hendrix’s take on the story of the man running south of the border to escape the law and the consequences of his crime. Willy totally identified with the ‘bandido’ persona and slid into that character like a hand into a glove.

== Other information ==
The cover photo for Backstreets of Desire was taken in a shrine at St. Roch Chapel in New Orleans. DeVille is shown sitting on the floor of the chapel surrounded by marble thank-you tiles, plaster casts of feet, polio braces, eyeballs, spider and cockroach parts, and other votive offerings.

Backstreets of Desire is dedicated to Doc Pomus, the Rock and Roll Hall of Fame songwriter with whom DeVille wrote songs for his Le Chat Bleu and Sportin' Life albums. The dedication reads: "Dedicated to the memory and inspiration that Doc Pomus freely gave to me and all music from his heart. His influence will forever be engraved in my soul." Pomus died in 1991, the year before Backstreets of Desire was recorded.

The song "Chemical Warfare" is dedicated to Johnny Thunders, the New York Dolls guitarist whom DeVille knew from his days playing Max's Kansas City in the mid-1970s and who died of a heroin overdose in New Orleans in 1991 in a hotel near DeVille's apartment in the French Quarter. DeVille was one of the first to discover the body.

DeVille originally made "I Call Your Name" during recording sessions for his 1987 album Miracle (the song appeared on a CD single with the song "Miracle"; Polyldor POCD 891). For Backstreets of Desire, he recorded another, more lush, string-arranged version of the song.

The song "Voodoo Charm" is also on DeVille's 1995 album Big Easy Fantasy. Under the title "Jump Steady Come My Way," the song "Jump City" appears on the 1999 album The Orleans Records Story (Orleans Records OR-2311).

Fourteen-year-old Tamera and Tia Mowry, future stars of the TV show Sister, Sister, sang background vocals on "Chemical Warfare."

== Track listing ==
Unless otherwise noted, all songs by Willy DeVille.

1. "Empty Heart" - 4:36
  - Willy DeVille on vocals; John Philip Shenale on keyboards, sythensizer, percussion; Brian Ray on guitars; Dennis Fongheiser on drums
2. "All in the Name of Love" - 3:35
  - Willy DeVille on vocals, John Philip Shenale on keyboards; Brian Ray on guitars; Reggie McBride on bass; Dennis Fongheiser on drums; Billy Valentine, John Valentine, Willy DeVille on background vocals
3. "Lonely Hunter" - 4:06
  - Willy DeVille on vocals; Freddy Koella on guitar, mandolin, violin; Reggie McBride on bass; Efrain Toro on shaker; Dennis Fongheiser on drums; Billy Valentine, Willy DeVille on background vocals
4. "Even While I Sleep" - 4:30
  - Willy DeVille on vocals; David Hidalgo on accordion; John Philip Shenale on piano, sythensizer, percussion; Brian Ray on guitars; Reggie McBride on bass; Efrain Toro on percussion; Dennis Fongheiser on drums
5. "Voodoo Charm" - 4:11
  - Willy DeVille on vocals; Dr. John on piano, synthesizer; Jeff "Skunk" Baxter on guitar; Reggie McBride on bass; Luis Conte on percussion; Fred Staehle on drums, wingertree; Steve Madaio on trumpet; Lon Price on tenor sax; Joel Peskin on baritone saxophone; John "Streamline" Ewing on trombone; Freebo on tuba; Bonnie Sheridan on voodoo queen background vocal
6. "Come to Poppa" – (Willie Mitchell, Earl Randall) - 4:33
  - Willy DeVille on vocals; John Philip Shenale on piano, percussion; Brian Ray on guitars; Reggie McBride on bass; Dennis Fongheiser on drums; Efrain Toro on congas; Jimmy Z (Jimmy Zavala) on harmonica
7. "Chemical Warfare" - 4:18
  - Willy DeVille on vocals; John Philip Shenale on synthesizers, percussion; Brian Ray on guitars, Dennis Fongheiser on drums; Efrain Toro on congos; Jimmy Z on harmonica; Quincy McCrary, Elizabeth Moss, Tamera Mowry, Tia Mowry on background vocals
8. "Hey Joe" – (Billy Roberts) - 4:14
  - Willy DeVille on vocals, Los Camperos de Nati Cano, Efrain Toro on percussion
9. "I Call Your Name" - 4:33
  - Willy DeVille on vocals; John Philip Shenale on piano, strings, percussion; Freddy Koella on guitar; Reggie McBride on bass; Dennis Fongheiser on drums, percussion
10. "I Can Only Give You Everything" - 4:56
  - Willy DeVille on vocals; John Philip Shenale on keyboards, percussion; Freddy Koella on guitar; Reggie McBride on bass; Dennis Fongheiser on drums; Billy Valentine on background vocals
11. "Jump City" - 5:00
  - Willy DeVille on vocals; Dr. John on piano, tambourine; Jeff "Skunk" Baxter on guitar; Reggie McBride on bass; Luis Conte on percussion; Fred Staehle on drums, wingertree; Steve Madaio on trumpet; Lon Price on tenor sax; Joel Peskin on baritone saxophone; John "Streamline" Ewing on trombone; Freebo on tuba; Lost Angels of the Vieux Carré on background vocals
12. "Bamboo Road" - 5:05
  - Willy DeVille on vocals, slide guitar; Zachary Richard on accordion; Freddy Koella on mandolin; Reggie McBride on acoustic bass; John Philip Shenale on percussion; Dennis Fongheiser on percussion; Willy DeVille, Billy Valentine, John Valentine, Jim Gilstrap on background vocals
13. "All in the Name of Love (Salvation Army Version)" - 3:39
  - Willy DeVille on vocals; John Philip Shenale on percussion and all other instruments; Willy DeVille, Billy Valentine, The Lost Angels Band of Salvation Choir on background vocals

== Personnel ==
- Jeff "Skunk" Baxter - guitar ("Jump City," "Voodoo Charm")
- Children's Choir ("Chemical Warfare")
  - Quincy McCrary
  - Elizabeth Moss
  - Tamera Mowry
  - Tia Mowry
  - Marta Woodhull (dir)
- Luis Conte - percussion ("Jump City," "Voodoo Charm")
- Willy DeVille - vocals, slide guitar
- Dr. John - synthesizer, piano, tambourine, horn arrangements ("Jump City," "Voodoo Charm")
- John "Streamline" Ewing - trombone ("Jump City," "Voodoo Charm")
- Dennis Fongheiser - percussion, drums
- Freebo - tuba ("Jump City," "Voodoo Charm")
- Jim Gilstrap - background vocals ("Bamboo Road")
- David Hidalgo - accordion ("Even While I Sleep")
- Freddy Koella - guitar, mandolin, violin
- Lost Angels Band of Salvation Choir - background vocals
- The Lost Angels of the Vieux Carre - background vocals
- Steve Madaio - trumpet ("Jump City")
- Los Camperos de Nati Cano ("Hey Joe")
  - Victor Manuel Villa - violin, arranger
  - Juan Jose Almaguer - violin, gritos
  - Jesús Guzmán - violin, gritos
  - Juan Morales - guitar
  - Luis Damian - vihuela
  - Jose Arellano - guitarrón
  - Carlos "Gudino" Jimenez - trumpet
- Reggie McBride - bass, fretless bass
- Joel Peskin - baritone saxophone ("Jump City," "Voodoo Charm")
- Lon Price - saxophone ("Jump City," "Voodoo Charm")
- Brian Ray - guitar
- Zachary Richard - accordion ("Bamboo Road")
- John Philip Shenale - synthesizer, percussion, piano, strings, keyboards
- Bonnie Sheridan - background vocals ("Voodoo Charm")
- Fred Staehle - drums, wingertree
- Efrain Toro - percussion, conga, sound effects, shaker
- The Valentine Brothers - background vocals
  - Billy Valentine
  - John Valentine
- Jimmy Z (Jimmy Zavala) - harmonica ("Come to Poppa")

=== Production ===
- Ken Allardyce - assistant engineer (Ocean Way)
- John Carter - recording engineer
- Willy DeVille - producer
- Dr. John - producer ("Voodoo Charm," "Jump City")
- Dave Lopez - assistant engineer (One on One)
- John Lowson - assistant engineer (Hot Tin Roof)
- Pete Magdeleno - assistant engineer (Track Record)
- Mark McKenna – mixing ("Chemical Warfare")
- Elli Medeiros – cover design
- Philippe Rault - executive producer
- Doug Rider - recording engineer ("Hey Joe", "Jump City," "Voodoo Charm")
- Sean Rowbottom - assistant engineer (Pacifique)
- Doug Saks – mastering
- Rocky Schenk – photographer
- Al Schmitt – mixing
- John Philip Shenale - producer
