= Eddie Bo =

American singer and pianist (1930–2009)

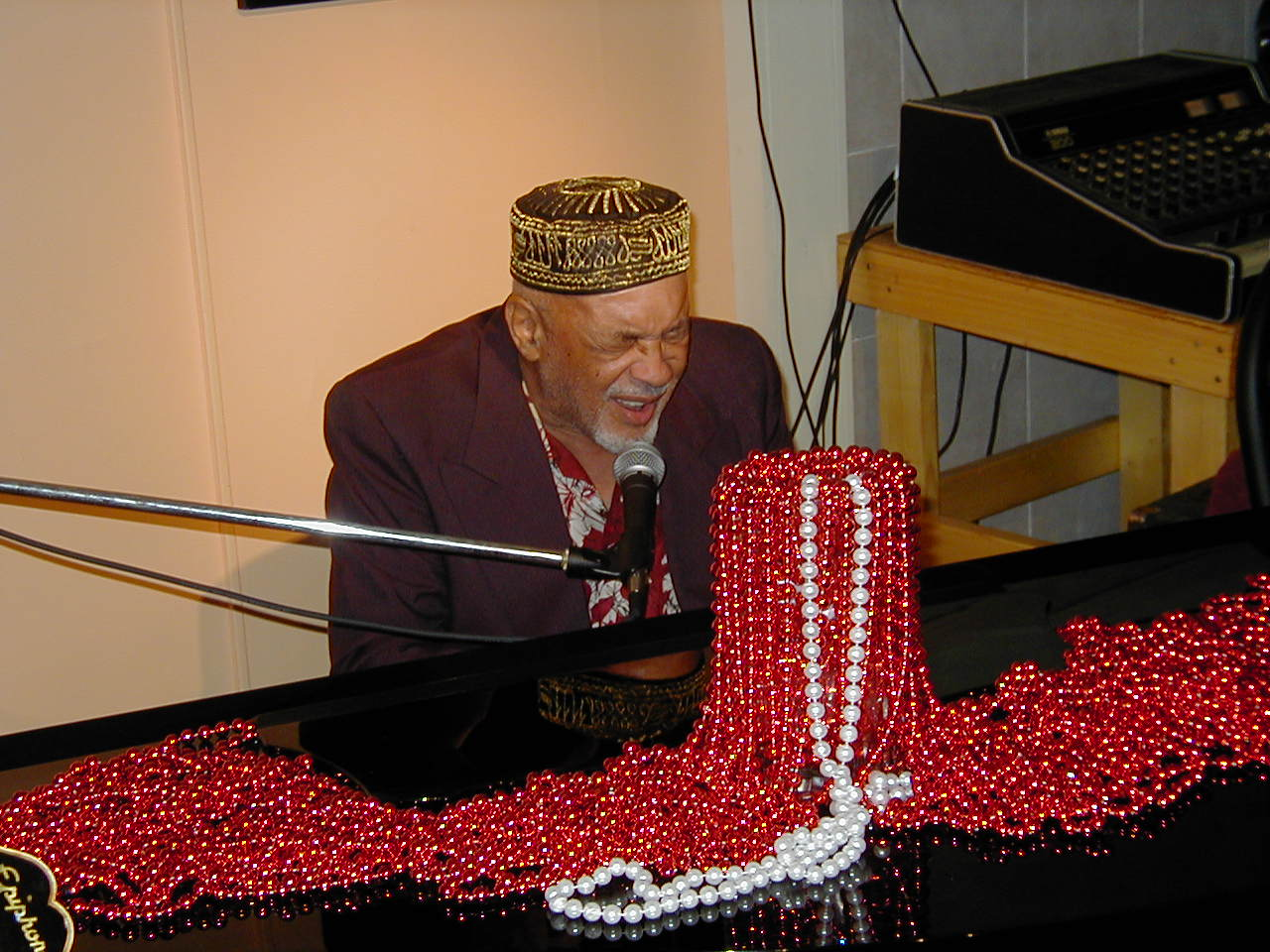
- Bo at his club Check Your Bucket in New Orleans (2004)

Background information
- Also known as: Spider Bocage
- Born: Edwin Joseph Bocage; September 20, 1930; New Orleans, Louisiana, U.S.
- Died: March 18, 2009 (aged 78) Picayune, Mississippi, U.S.
- Genres: Blues, New Orleans R&B, funk, soul
- Occupation: Musician
- Instruments: Vocals, piano
- Years active: 1955–2009
- Labels: Bo-Sound, Ace, Chess, Ric, Apollo, Soulciety, Scram, Seven B, Blue Jay
- Website: Eddiebo.com/

Edwin Joseph Bocage (September 20, 1930 – March 18, 2009), known as Eddie Bo, was an American singer and pianist from New Orleans. Schooled in jazz, he was known for his blues, soul and funk recordings, compositions, productions and arrangements. He debuted on Ace Records in 1955 and released more single records than anyone in New Orleans other than Fats Domino.

Eddie Bo worked and recorded for more than 40 different record labels, including Ace, Apollo, Arrow, At Last, Blue-Jay, Bo-Sound, Checker, Chess, Cinderella, Nola, Ric (for which business his carpentry skills were used to build a studio), Scram, Seven B, and Swan. Allmusic calls him "a sorely underappreciated veteran of the New Orleans R&B scene."

== Biography ==
=== Early life ===
Eddie Bo grew up in Algiers, Louisiana and in the Ninth Ward of New Orleans. He came from a long line of ship builders with the male members of his family being bricklayers, carpenters and masons by day and musicians by night. Eddie's mother was a self-taught pianist in the style of friend, Professor Longhair. The Bocage family was involved in the traditional jazz community with cousins Charles, Henry and Peter, who played with Sidney Bechet, contributing to jazz orchestras before World War II.

Eddie graduated from Booker T. Washington High School before going into the army. After his army stint, he returned to New Orleans to study at the Grunewald School of Music. There he learned piano and music theory, and to sight read and arrange music. At this time he was influenced by Russian classical pianist Vladimir Horowitz and was introduced to jazz pianists Art Tatum and Oscar Peterson. He began playing in the New Orleans jazz scene, but switched to R&B after deciding it was more popular and brought in more money. Like a lot of other local musicians Eddie frequented the premier blues venue in town, the Dew Drop Inn on LaSalle Street. He played at the Club Tijuana under the name of Spider Bocage, later forming the Spider Bocage Orchestra, which toured the country supporting singers Big Joe Turner, Earl King, Guitar Slim, Johnny Adams, Lloyd Price, Ruth Brown, Smiley Lewis, and The Platters.

=== Recording and production career ===
His first released record in 1955 was "Baby", recorded for Johnny Vincent's Ace Records. His next release, in 1956 on Apollo Records, was "I'm Wise", which Little Richard later recorded as "Slippin' and Slidin'". After several releases on Ace he recorded "My Dearest Darling" in 1957 for Chess Records; the song, co-written by Bo and Paul Gayten, became a national chart hit in 1960 when recorded by Etta James. From 1959, he recorded for Ric Records, and had regional hits including "Every Dog Has Its Day" and "Tell It Like It Is", and in 1961 recorded the novelty dance song "Check Mr Popeye", reissued nationally by Swan Records, which became one of his best-known recordings though not a national hit.

During the 1960s, Bo continued to release singles on a string of local record labels, including Rip, Cinderella, and Blue Jay, though only a few achieved national distribution. On these records, his style got funkier, and he used more of his jazz training, helping to create a distinctively different and influential New Orleans piano style. He recorded the renowned "Pass The Hatchet" under the nom de disque Roger and the Gypsies for Joe Banashak's Seven B label as well as "Fence of Love" and "SGB" (Stone Graveyard Business) under his own name. He either wrote or produced most of the titles on Seven B records. He also worked as a record producer, with musicians including Irma Thomas, Chris Kenner, Johnny Adams, Al "Carnival Time" Johnson, Art Neville, Chuck Carbo, Mary Jane Hooper, Robert Parker, and The Explosions. In 1969, at the height of funk, he had his only national chart hit, "Hook and Sling, Pts. 1 & 2", which reached number 13 on the Billboard R&B chart and number 73 on the pop chart. The song, on the Scram label, was recorded in just one take. He then formed his own label, Bo-Sound, and had another regional hit with "Check Your Bucket".

From the early 1970s Bo worked in the music business only sporadically, after setting up his own renovation business. In 1977 he released two albums, The Other Side of Eddie Bo and Watch for the Coming, which he produced himself. In the late 1980s and 1990s he recorded with the Dirty Dozen Brass Band, with whom he toured Europe, and resurrected his Bo-Sound label. He joined Willy DeVille to play on two DeVille records, Victory Mixture and Big Easy Fantasy, and he toured with DeVille as well. He later played and recorded with Raful Neal and Rockin' Tabby Thomas under the names The Louisiana Legends, The District Court and The Hoodoo Kings. He continued to perform frequently in New Orleans and at festivals elsewhere, and toured intermittently. He also bought a doctor's office and salon on Banks Street which he and his manager converted into an eatery for fans called Check Your Bucket after his 1970 hit. Like his home and recording studio it was hit by Hurricane Katrina while Bo was on tour in Paris. Due to Bo's carpentry and bricklaying skills he took on the task of completing the hurricane-damage repairs himself.

=== Death and aftermath ===
Eddie Bo died on March 18, 2009, in Picayune, Mississippi, United States, of a heart attack, aged 78. After his death, his body was cremated on the instructions of a woman claiming to be his sister, although other close relatives of Bo have subsequently claimed that she was unrelated to him.

A memorial concert was held in his memory on April 1, 2009, with guests including Dr. John, Irma Thomas and Allen Toussaint.

=== Family ===
Eddie Bo was survived by two sisters—Gloria Bocage-Sylva, who lives in Oakland, California, and Lisa Bocage-Howard—and two brothers—Oliver and Cornelius—plus eleven children, including Valeri Ann Bocage, Edwin Joseph Bocage, Jr., Owen David Bocage, Nancy Marie Bocage-Siegel, Cheryl Bocage-Joseph, Tanya Bocage-Sales, Sonjia Bocage-Anderson, Tomekia Bocage-Jones and Ava Nicol.

== Popular references ==
Phantogram's song "You Don't Get Me High Anymore" samples the drum break from "Hook And Sling (Part I)," which Bo wrote with Alfred Scramuzza.

== Awards and recognitions ==
He won many music awards, including two Lifetime Achievement awards from the South Louisiana Music Association and Music/Offbeat Best of the Beat. His song "Hook and Sling" was featured on the breakbeat compilation Ultimate Breaks and Beats. May 22, 1997 was declared "Eddie Bo Day" in New Orleans by mayor Marc Morial while Bo was playing in Karachi, Pakistan. Bo was also named New Orleans' music ambassador to Pakistan.

== Discography ==
=== Singles ===
- 1955: "Baby" / "So Glad" (Ace)
- 1955: "I'm So Tired" / "We Like Mambo" (B-side is actually Huey "Piano" Smith) (Ace)
- 1956: "I'm Wise" / "Happy Tears" (Apollo)
- 1956: "Please Forgive Me" / "I'll Be Satisfied" (Apollo)
- 1956: "I Cry Oh" / "My Heart Was Meant For You" (Apollo)
- 1956: "Tell Me Why" / "Hey Bo" (instrumental) (Apollo)
- 1956: "Dearest One" / "Too Much of a Good Thing" (Apollo)
- 1957: "Every Day and Every Night" / "Indeed I Do" (Checker)
- 1958: "My Dearest Darling" / "Oh-Oh" (Chess)
- 1958: "Walk That Walk" / "Hep Hep Hooray" (Chess)
- 1959: "I'll Keep On Trying" / "I Love To Rock and Roll" (Ace)
- 1959: "Hey There Baby" / "I Need Someone" (Ric)
- 1959: "You Got Your Mojo Working" / "Everybody Knows" (Ric)
- 1960: "Tell It Like It Is" / "Every Dog Got His Day" (Ric)
- 1960: "Warm Daddy" / "Ain't It the Truth Now" (Ric)
- 1961: "It Must Be Love" / "What a Fool I've Been (Ric)
- 1961: "Dinky Doo" / "Everybody, Everything Needs Love" (Ric)
- 1961: "Dinky Doo" / "Everybody, Everything Needs Love" (Capitol)
- 1961: "I Got To Know" / "Bless You Darling" (Ric)
- 1962: "Check Mr. Popeye (Part I)" / "Now Let's Popeye (Part II)" (Ric)
- 1962: "Check Mr. Popeye" / "Now Let's Popeye" (Swan)
- 1962: "Baby I'm Wise" / "Roamin–Titis" (Ric)
- 1962: "Let's Limbo" / "Mo–Jo" (Rip)
- 1962: "You're With Me" / "You're The Only One" (Rip)
- 1962: "You're With Me" / "You're The Only One" (Chess)
- 1962: "Woman" / "Temptation" (Rip)
- 1962: "Mama Said" / "Tee Na Na" by Reggie Hall (Rip) arranged/conducted by Eddie Bo
- 1963: "Te Na Na Nay" / "Twinkle Toes" (At Last)
- 1963: "Hold Me" / "I Found a Little Girl" (At Last)
- 1963: "Reassure Me" / "Shake, Rock and Soul" (Cinderella)
- 1963: "Just Like a Monkey" / "Have Mercy on Me" (Cinderella)
- 1964: "You Are Going To Be Somebody's Fool" / "A Heap See (But a Few Know)" (Nola)
- 1964: "Fare Thee Well" / "Let's Let It Roll" (Arrow)
- 1964: "Fare Thee Well" / "Let's Let It Roll" (Chess)
- 1964: "Gotta Have More" / "Come With Me" (Blue Jay)
- 1964: "The River of Tears" / "Fight It" (Blue Jay)
- 1964: "Danger" / "Fee-Fie-Jum-Bo-Li" (Blue Jay)
- 1965: "Our Love (Will Never Falter)" / "Lucky In Love" (Blue Jay)
- 1966: "What You Gonna Do" / "Fallin' In Love Again" (Seven B)
- 1966: "From This Day On" / "Let Our Love Begin" (Seven B)
- 1967: "Just Friends" / "Fence of Love" (Seven B)
- 1967: "All I Ask of You" / "Skate It Out" (Seven B)
- 1967: "Solid Foundation" / "S.G.B. (Stone Graveyard Business)" (Seven B)
- 1968: "Lover and a Friend" / "If I Had To Do It Over" with Inez Cheatham (Seven B)
- 1968: "Lover and a Friend" / "If I Had To Do It Over" with Inez Cheatham (Capitol)
- 1969: "Love Has Been Good" / "That Certain Someone" (Scram)
- 1969: "Hook and Sling (Parts 1 & 2)" (Scram)
- 1969: "If It's Good To You (It's Good For You) (Parts 1 & 2)" (Scram)
- 1970: "We're Doing It (Thang) (Parts 1 & 2)" (Bo-Sound)
- 1970: "Can You Handle It" / "Don't Turn Me Loose" (Bo-Sound)
- 1970: "Check Your Bucket (Parts 1 & 2)" (Bo-Sound)
- 1971: "The Rubber Band (Parts 1 & 2)" (Knight)

=== Albums ===
| Year of release | Title | Record label |
|---|---|---|
| 1977 | The Other Side of Eddie Bo | Bo-Sound |
| 1979 | Another Side of Eddie Bo | Bo-Sound |
| 1984 | Watch For the Coming | Bo-Sound |
| 1988 | Vippin' & Voppin' | Charly |
| 1988 | Check Mr. Popeye | Rounder |
| 1992 | Brink of a New Day | Eboville |
| 1993 | New Orleans Piano Riffs for DJs | Tuff City |
| 1995 | New Orleans Solo Piano | Night Train International |
| 1995 | Eddie Bo and Friends | Bo-Sound |
| 1996 | Back Up This Train | Bo-Sound |
| 1996 | Oo La La, Mardi Gras | Bo-Sound |
| 1997 | The Hook and Sling | Funky Delicacies |
| 1997 | The Best of Eddie Bo | Hubbub |
| 1997 | Shoot From the Root | Soulciety |
| 1998 | Hole In It | Soulciety |
| 1998 | Nine Yards of Funk | Bo-Sound |
| 2001 | We Come to Party | Bo-Sound |
| 2007 | Saints, Let's Go Marching On In | Bo-Sound |
| 2008 | In the Pocket With Eddie Bo | Vampi Soul |
| 2015 | Baby I'm Wise: The Complete Ric Singles 1959-1962 | Ace |
| 2016 | The 1991 Sea Saint Sessions | Last Music Company |

== Filmography ==
- 2006: New Orleans Music in Exile
