= Miracle (Willy DeVille album) =

Studio album by Willy DeVille
- Released: October 31, 1987
- Recorded: London
- Genres: Rock, soul
- Length: 47:17
- Label: A&M
- Producer: Mark Knopfler

Mink DeVille / Willy DeVille chronology
Sportin’ Life (1985)	Miracle (1987)	Victory Mixture (1990)

Miracle is an album by Willy DeVille. Recorded in 1987, it was the first album that Willy DeVille recorded under his own name. Prior to Miracle, DeVille recorded six albums with the band Mink DeVille, the last four of which were really solo albums by Willy DeVille in that no members of the original band played on the four albums.

Miracle was recorded in London and produced by Dire Straits guitarist Mark Knopfler, who also co-wrote the song “Spanish Jack” with DeVille. Dire Straits keyboardist Guy Fletcher, like Knopfler, played on all songs. Two highly regarded session musicians, guitarist Chet Atkins and drummer Jeff Porcaro, also played on the album.

DeVille told Leap in the Dark:

It was Mark (Knopfler’s) wife Lourdes who came up with the idea (to record Miracle). She said to him that you don't sing like Willy and he doesn't play guitar like you, but you really like his stuff so why don't you do an album together? So I went over to London to do this album. It wasn't easy because we didn't want it to sound like a Dire Straits album, and his guitar playing is so unique that it was hard to do. But nothing good is going to be easy. I know that I spent the whole time really trying to impress Mark, I wanted it to be good.

== The Academy Awards: "Storybook Love" ==
The album includes what is probably the best known Willy DeVille song, "Storybook Love". The song was the theme of the movie The Princess Bride and was nominated for an Academy Award in 1987. DeVille performed it at that year's Academy Award ceremony.

Knopfler heard ("Storybook Love") and asked if I knew about this movie he was doing. It was a Rob Reiner film about a princess and a prince. The song was about the same subject matter as the film, so we submitted it to Reiner and he loved it. About six or seven months later, I was half asleep when the phone rang. It was the Academy of Arts and Sciences with the whole spiel. I hung up on them! They called back and Lisa (his wife) answered the phone. She came in to tell me that I was nominated for "Storybook Love." It's pretty wild. It's not the Grammys — it's the Academy Awards, which is different for a musician. Before I knew it, I was performing on the awards show with Little Richard. It was the year of Dirty Dancing, and they won.

== Critical Reviews ==
Professional ratings
Review scores
Source	Rating
Allmusic	4/5 stars

Cover of the 1994 Raven CD reissue of Miracle.

Trouser Press called the album's production “bland and gimmicky,” but added, “DeVille's seasoned voice is as strong and colorful as ever, putting the snappy 'Angel Eyes,' romantic 'Nightfalls' and Van Morrison's 'Could You Would You?' in the album's plus column.”

Thom Jurek of Allmusic wrote, "There is a notable difference in production style thanks to Dire Strait Mark Knopfler at the helm, softening the edges a bit and changing the focus to DeVille as a singer of fine pop ballads. The set yielded a surprise sideways hit in the tune 'Storybook Love,' which Knopfler borrowed for his soundtrack to The Princess Bride, but the album received little promotion or airplay. Too bad. The title track and the gorgeous 'Angel Eyes' offer great evidence for DeVille as a unique vocal stylist whose roots lay in the rock & roll of the Doc Pomus generation, and 'Could You Would You,' written by Van Morrison, is one of DeVille's finest cover songs."

== Other information ==
About Miracle, DeVille told Sounds, "This is the first album where I had left-overs. The doggy bag! I got good stuff on the record. I got good stuff off the record — 22 songs! I wrote and I wrote...it was a cakewalk. It was so easy. Of course we had some problems. It was so powerful, nothing could get in the way. We worked on the album for four or five months."

DeVille said about the song "Heart and Soul": "It's a song about a couple who is very in love. They have no money, but someday they wanna get married in a big church and have a gold earring and new boots. And you wanna look so pretty for that girl... I think men always try to be so 'macho'... I think that's very stupid. There's nothing wrong with being a pretty man. In fact, I can't wait until tomorrow, I'm getting better-looking every day."

The song "Assassin of Love" was used in the British film version of The Rachel Papers, which helped make Willy DeVille better known in the UK. It was also played extensively as the "sound check" song before most of the concerts during the band U2's 360° North American tour in 2009.

The Raven Records CD re-issue of Miracle includes three Jack Nitzsche-produced songs recorded in 1980: "Heat Of The Moment," "Pullin' My String," and "It's So Easy." These songs were recorded for the soundtrack of the movie Cruising. "It's So Easy" is also on the soundtrack of Quentin Tarantino's movie Grindhouse: Death Proof. . DeVille made the original recording of "I Call Your Name" for this album. It appeared on a CD single with the song "Miracle" (Polydor POCD 891). DeVille recorded a second, lusher, string-arranged version of "I Call Your Name" for his album Backstreets of Desire (1992).

Mark Knopfler, a champion of DeVille's music, said of DeVille after learning he had been diagnosed with cancer, "I've been an admirer of Willy's since hearing his stunning voice on the radio for the first time. He has an enormous range, with influences from all corners of the country, from Muddy Waters and John Lee Hooker and New Orleans music to Latin, folk-rock, doo-wop, Ben E. King-style soul and R&B — all part of the New York mix. The songs he writes are original, often romantic and always straight from the heart. He can paint a character in a few words. When we worked on his Miracle album I enjoyed the occasional opportunity to offer a chord or two to go with his great lyrics."

== Track listing ==
Unless otherwise noted, all songs by Willy DeVille.

1. (Due to) Gun Control – 5:54
  - Willy DeVille on vocals, Mark Knopfler on guitar, Guy Fletcher on keyboards, Jamie Lane on drums, Margot Buchanan and Vicki Brown on background vocals
2. Could You Would You? (Van Morrison) – 3:31
  - Willy DeVille on vocals, Mark Knopfler on guitar, Guy Fletcher on keyboards, Mickey Feat on bass, Errol Bennett on percussion, Jeff Porcaro on drums
3. Heart and Soul – 4:06
  - Willy DeVille on vocals, Mark Knopfler on guitar, Chet Atkins on guitar, Guy Fletcher on keyboards, Mickey Feat on bass, Margot Buchanan and Vicki Brown on background vocals, Errol Bennett on percussion
4. Assassin of Love – 4:09
  - Willy DeVille on vocals, Mark Knopfler on guitar, Guy Fletcher on keyboards, Jamie Lane on drums, Mickey Feat on bass, Margot Buchanan and Vicki Brown on background vocals, Errol Bennett on percussion
5. Spanish Jack (Willy DeVille, Mark Knopfler) – 3:49
  - Willy DeVille on vocals, Mark Knopfler on guitar, Guy Fletcher on keyboards, Jamie Lane on drums, Mickey Feat on bass
6. Miracle – 4:51
  - Willy DeVille on vocals, Mark Knopfler on guitar, Guy Fletcher on keyboards, Mickey Feat on bass, Margot Buchanan and Vicki Brown on background vocals, Jeff Porcaro on drums
7. Angel Eyes – 4:48
  - Willy DeVille on vocals, Mark Knopfler on guitar, Guy Fletcher on keyboards, Jamie Lane on drums, Mickey Feat on bass, Errol Bennett on percussion
8. Nightfalls – 4:48
  - Willy DeVille on vocals, Mark Knopfler on guitar, Guy Fletcher on keyboards, Mickey Feat on bass
9. Southern Politician – 6:32
  - Willy DeVille on vocals, Mark Knopfler on guitar, Guy Fletcher on keyboards, Jamie Lane on drums, Mickey Feat on bass, Errol Bennett on percussion
10. Storybook Love – 4:26
  - Willy DeVille on vocals, Mark Knopfler on guitar, Guy Fletcher on keyboards, Jamie Lane on drums, Mickey Feat on bass

== Charts ==
Chart (1987)	Peak position
Australian (Kent Music Report)	73

== Personnel ==
- Chet Atkins - guitar ("Heart and Soul")
- Errol "Crusher" Bennett - percussion
- Vicki Brown - background vocals
- Margot Buchanan - background vocals
- Willy DeVille - vocals, background vocals
- Mickey Feat - bass, background vocals
- Guy Fletcher - keyboards, background vocals
- Mark Knopfler - guitar
- Jamie Lane - drums
- Jeff Porcaro - drums ("Could You Would You?," "Miracle")

=== Production ===
- Bob Clearmountain – mixing
- Jay Healy - mixing assistant
- Steve Jackson – engineer
- Mark Knopfler – producer
- Karl Lever – assistant engineer
- Melanie Nissen – art direction and design
- Rocky Schenk – photography
