= Big Easy Fantasy =

Live album by Willy DeVille
- Released: October 31, 1995
- Studio: The Bottom Line (New York City); Olympia Theatre (Paris); Sea Saint (New Orleans); Westlake (Los Angeles); Track Studio (Los Angeles)
- Genre: R&B, Soul, Blues, Creole
- Length: 48:34
- Label: New Rose (France)
- Producer: Philippe Rault; Carlo Ditta; Dr. John; Willy DeVille

Willy DeVille chronology
Willy DeVille Live (1993)	Big Easy Fantasy (1995)	Loup Garou (1996)

Big Easy Fantasy is an album by Willy DeVille and the Mink DeVille Band. It was released in Europe on the French New Rose label in 1995. The album is a mixture of studio tracks and concert recordings made in New York and Paris. The "big easy" of the album's title refers to New Orleans. As the album cover says, the inspiration for the album was "Jump City, the Crescent City, the city that care forgot, New Orleans...The Big Easy!" All songs on the album are standards by New Orleans musicians or are original compositions by Willy DeVille about some aspect of New Orleans.

== Background ==
In the mid-1990s, Willy DeVille did not have a recording contract with an American label, but he was very popular in Europe in the wake of his successful 1992 "New Orleans Revue" tour of the continent and his 1993 European tour with the Mink DeVille Band (which resulted in 1993's Willy DeVille Live.) The "New Orleans Revue" came about after DeVille recorded Victory Mixture, a tribute album of cover versions of New Orleans R&B and soul songs. The Revue comprised Willy DeVille, The Mink DeVille Band, and guest musicians Dr John, Johnny Adams, Zachary Richard, and The Wild Magnolias. DeVille said about the tour, "The travel, buses, and planes and the accommodations had to be some of the worst I've ever experienced, but the shows themselves were great. At the end of each show we'd throw Mardi Gras rows out to the audience, you know strands of purple and gold beads, and they'd never seen anything like it and they loved it.”

Big Easy Fantasy presents live recordings of The Mink DeVille Band playing with New Orleans legends Eddie Bo and The Wild Magnolias; some remixes from the Victory Mixture sessions; and "Voodoo Charm," a cut previously heard on 1992's Backstreets of Desire album. "Teasing You," "Beating Like a Tom-Tom," and ”Who Shot the La-La” are also on the Victory Mixture album, but have slightly different horn arrangements and background vocals. "Just Off Decatur Street," recorded during the Victory Mixture sessions and remixed later on, appears only on Big Easy Fantasy.

== Reviews ==
Trouser Press called the album "another successful exploration of New Orleans' musical heritage; the re-energized DeVille holds his own while sharing the stage and the spotlight with an even more impressive array of Crescent City luminaries." Randy Krbechek said about Big Easy Fantasy, "For my money, I'd have released this album as either an all-live set, or an all-studio recording. However, I'm not complaining too loudly—DeVille's a great talent, and any serving from him is richly welcomed."

== Other information ==
The album includes a booklet with information about when cover songs were initially recorded and who played on each song.

Remixing of songs from the Victory Mixture sessions was done at the Westlake Studio in Los Angeles in August, 1995. DeVille began working on his next album, Loup Garou, later that year in Los Angeles.

== Track listing ==
Unless otherwise noted, all songs by Willy DeVille.

1. "Jump City" - 5:41
  - Mink DeVille band; recorded live at the Olympia Theatre
2. "Every Dog Has Its Day" (Eddie Bocage) - 2:10
  - Mink DeVille band with Eddie Bo on vocals, piano; recorded live at The Bottom Line
3. "Hello My Lover" (Clarence Toussaint) - 3:44
  - Mink DeVille band; recorded live at the Olympia Theatre
4. "Key to My Heart" (Eddie Bocage) - 4:31
  - Mink DeVille band with Eddie Bo on piano; recorded live at The Bottom Line
5. "Bamboo Road" - 4:56
  - Mink DeVille band (Willy DeVille on dobro); recorded live at The Bottom Line
6. "Iko Iko" (James "Sugar Boy" Crawford; traditional) - 5:13
  - Mink DeVille band with the Wild Magnolias on vocals, tambourines, bass drum; recorded live at The Bottom Line
7. "Meet the Boys (on the Battlefront)" (traditional) - 3:03
  - Mink DeVille band with the Wild Magnolias on vocals, tambourines, bass drum; recorded live at The Bottom Line
8. "Just Off Decatur Street" - 4:22
  - Willy DeVille on vocals, Dr. John on piano, Leo Nocentelli on guitar, George Porter on bass guitar, Chris Spedding on dobro, Kerry Brown on drums, Lon Price on tenor saxophone, Steve Madaio on trumpet, Kate Markowitz and Valerie Mayo on background vocals; recorded at Sea Saint Studio, New Orleans and Westlake Studio, Los Angeles
9. "Teasing You" (Earl King) - 3:30
  - Willy DeVille on vocals, Isaac Bolden on piano, Freddy Koëlla on guitar, René Coman on bass guitar, Kerry Brown on drums, Lon Price on tenor saxophone, Steve Madaio on trumpet, Willy DeVille on harmony vocal; recorded at Sea Saint Studio and Westlake Studio
10. "Beating Like A Tom-Tom" (Ernest Kador) - 4:17
  - Willy DeVille on vocals, Allen Toussaint on piano, Wayne Bennett on guitar, René Coman on bass guitar, Johnny Vidacovich on drums, Steve Croes on sudra drum, Lon Price on tenor saxophone, Steve Madaio on trumpet, Dorene and YaDonna Wise on background vocals, Kate Markowitz on background vocals, James Gilstrap on background vocals; recorded at Sea Saint Studio and Westlake Studio
11. ”Who Shot the La-La” (Eddie Bocage, D. Burmak, Theresa Terry) - 2:56
  - Willy DeVille on vocals, Eddie Bo on piano, Bill Gregory on guitar, Freddy Koëlla on guitar, René Coman on bass guitar, Porgy Jones on tambourine, Johnny Vidacovich on drums, Allison Miner on background vocals, Dereme and YaDonna Wise on background vocals, James Gilstrap on background vocals; recorded at Sea Saint Studio and Westlake Studio
12. "Voodoo Charm" - 4:11
  - Willy DeVille on vocals, Jeff "Skunk" Baxter on guitar, Reggie McBride on bass guitar, Luis Conte on percussion, Fred Staehle on drums and wingertree, Steve Madaio on trumpet, Lon Price on tenor saxophone, Joel Peksin on baritone saxophone, John "Streamline" Ewing on trombone, Freebo on tuba, Bonnie Sheridan on background vocals; recorded at Track Studio, Los Angeles

== Personnel ==
=== The Mink DeVille Band ===
- The Brass Attack Horns
  - Louis Cortelezzi - saxophone
  - Steve Madaio - trumpet
  - Tom "Bones" Malone - trombone, baritone saxophone
- Mario Cruz - saxophone, percussion
- Willy DeVille - vocals, guitar, dobro
- Seth Farber - keyboards, accordion
- David Keyes - bass guitar, double bass
- Boris Kinberg - percussion
- Freddy Koëlla - guitar, violin, mandolin
- Shawn Murray - drums
- The Valentines (Valentine Brothers) - background vocals
  - Billy Valentine
  - Johnny "Briz" Valentine

=== Other musicians ===
- Jeff "Skunk" Baxter - guitar ("Voodoo Charm")
- Wayne Bennett - guitar ("Beating Like A Tom-Tom")
- Eddie Bo - vocals, piano
- Isaac Bolden - piano ("Teasing You")
- Kerry Brown - drums ("Just Off Decatur Street," "Teasing You")
- René Coman - bass guitar
- Luis Conte - percussion ("Voodoo Charm")
- Steve Croes - sudra drum ("Beating Like A Tom-Tom")
- Dr. John - piano ("Just Off Decatur Street")
- John "Streamline" Ewing - trombone ("Voodoo Charm")
- Freebo - tuba ("Voodoo Charm")
- James Gilstrap - background vocals ("Beating Like A Tom-Tom," "Who Shot the La-La")
- Bill Gregory - guitar ("Who Shot the La-La")
- Porgy Jones - tambourine ("Who Shot the La-La")
- Kate Markowitz - background vocals ("Just Off Decatur Street," "Beating Like A Tom-Tom")
- Valerie Mayo - background vocals ("Just Off Decatur Street")
- Reggie McBride - bass ("Voodoo Charm")
- Leo Nocentelli - guitar ("Just Off Decatur Street")
- Joel Peksin - baritone saxophone ("Voodoo Charm")
- George Porter - bass ("Just Off Decatur Street")
- Lon Price - tenor saxophone
- Bonnie Sheridan - background vocals ("Voodoo Charm")
- Chris Spedding - dobro ("Just Off Decatur Street")
- Fred Staehle - drums, wingertree ("Voodoo Charm")
- Allen Toussaint - piano ("Beating Like A Tom-Tom")
- Johnny Vidacovich - drums ("Beating Like A Tom-Tom," "Who Shot the La-La")
- The Wild Magnolias ("Iko Iko," "Meet the Boys [on the Battlefront])"
  - Chief Joseph "Monk" Boudreaux - vocals, tambourine
  - Chief Theodore "Bo" Dollis - vocals, tambourine
  - Norwood "Gitchie" Johnson - vocals, bass drum
- Dorene Wise – background vocals ("Beating Like A Tom-Tom," "Who Shot the La-La")
- YaDonna Wise - background vocals ("Beating Like A Tom-Tom," "Who Shot the La-La")
