= Horse of a Different Color (Willy DeVille album) =

Studio album by Willy DeVille
- Released: May 31, 1999
- Recorded: Ardent Studios; Memphis
- Genre: Blues, R&B, Soul
- Length: 43:18
- Label: EastWest
- Producer: Jim Dickinson; Luther Dickinson

Willy DeVille chronology
Loup Garou (1995)	Horse of a Different Color (1999)	Acoustic Trio Live in Berlin (2002)

Professional ratings
Review scores
Source	Rating
Allmusic	4.5/5 stars

Horse of a Different Color is a 1999 album by Willy DeVille. The album consists of original compositions and remakes of traditional Black music titles such as Fred McDowell's “Going over the Hill,” and Andre Williams' "Bacon Fat."

The album was recorded at Ardent Studios in Memphis. It was produced by Jim Dickinson, who brought along his son Luther to play guitar and his son Cody to play drums.

Allmusic called the album "the most consistent and brilliant recording of Willy DeVille's long career":

Before it's over, DeVille has reprised his soulman balladeer role — and no one sings them better — as well as cruising through a topical folk song, a chain-gang chant with a devastating rhythm track, and an R&B growler by Andre Williams before closing with his own "Time to Time," a broken-survivor song about love's ceaseless wars. Simply put, no one has this range or depth in interpreting not only styles, but also the poetics of virtually any set of lyrics. DeVille makes everything he sings believable. Horse of a Different Color is the most consistent and brilliant recording of Willy DeVille's long career.

DeVille recorded another version of “Across the Borderline“ with The Mink DeVille Band for a music video. This recording features Willy DeVille on vocals and guitar, Freddy Koëlla on guitar, David Keyes on bass, Boris Kinberg on percussion, and Dorene and Yadonna Wise on background vocals.

== Track listing ==
Unless otherwise noted, all songs by Willy DeVille.

1. “Gypsy Deck of Hearts“ - (Willy DeVille, Sal Bernardi) - 3:21
  - Willy DeVille on vocals; Roger Hawkins on drums; David Hood on bass; Luther Dickinson on guitar, mandolin; Jack Holder on guitar; Jim Dickinson on piano; Spooner Oldham on organ; Freddy Koella on violin; Rick Steff on accordion, autoharp; Andy Cohen on doceola; J.D. Westmoreland on tipples
2. “Across the Borderline“ - (Ry Cooder, John Hiatt, Jim Dickinson) - 3:38
  - Willy DeVille on vocals; Roger Hawkins on drums, percussion; David Hood on bass; Jack Holder on guitar; Luther Dickinson on acoustic slide guitar, mandolin; Spooner Oldham on piano; Jim Dickinson on Wurlitzer; Rick Steff on harp; Freddy Koella on violins; Susan Marshall, Brenda Patterson, Betram Brown, William Brown, John Crosthwait on background vocals
3. “Lay Me Down Easy“ - (Willy DeVille, Sal Bernardi) - 4:28
  - Willy DeVille on vocals; Roger Hawkins on drums; David Hood on bass; Jack Holder on acoustic guitar; Luther Dickinson on electric guitar, mandolin; Spooner Oldham on Wurlitzer; Jim Dickinson on piano, organ; Freddy Koella on violins; Jim Spake on saxophone; Scott Thompsen on trumpet; Susan Marshall, Brenda Patterson, Betram Brown, William Brown on background vocals
4. “Goin' Over the Hill“ - (Fred McDowell) - 2:21
  - Willy DeVille on vocals, tambourine; Luther Dickinson on electric slide guitar; Tate County Singers (Bernice Pratcher, Ada Thomas, Whitney Jefferies, Sharde Thomas) on background vocals
5. “One Love, One Lifetime“ - (Willy DeVille, Sal Bernardi) - 3:29
  - Willy DeVille on vocals; Roger Hawkins on drums; David Hood on bass; Luther Dickinson on guitar, sitar; Jack Holder, Jimmy Johnson on rhythm guitar; Spooner Oldham on organ; Jim Dickinson on vibes; Jim Spake on saxophone; Scott Thompsen on trumpet; Betram Brown, William Brown, Dexter Milan on background vocals
6. "Needles and Pins" - (Jack Nitzsche, Sonny Bono) - 3:04
  - Willy DeVille on vocals; Roger Hawkins on drums, percussion; David Hood on bass; Jimmy Johnson, Jack Holder on rhythm guitar; Luther Dickinson on lead guitar; Spooner Oldham on organ; Jim Dickinson on mellotron, Moog synthesizer
7. “18 Hammers“ - (Jack Butler, Phillip Moore) - 2:37
  - Willy DeVille on vocals; Cody Dickinson on drums; Luther Dickinson on electric side guitar; Jim Dickinson on electric piano; Betram Brown, William Brown, Jim Dickinson, Luther Dickinson, John Crosthwait, Sid Selvidge on background vocals
8. “(Don't Want You) Hanging Around My Door“ - 3:25
  - Willy DeVille on vocals, background vocals; Roger Hawkins on drums, percussion; David Hood on bass; Jimmy Johnson, Jack Holder on rhythm guitar; Luther Dickinson on lead guitar; Jim Dickinson on organ; Spooner Oldham on Wurlitzer; Freddy Joella on dulcimer; Jim Spake on saxophone; Scott Thompsen on trumpet; Brenda Patterson, Dexter Milan on background vocals
9. “The Downing of the Flamingo“ (Henry B. Knowles) - 5:15
  - Willy DeVille on vocals; Roger Hawkins on drums, percussion; David Hood on bass; Luther Dickinson on electric guitar, mandolin; Spooner Oldham on organ; Rick Steff on accordion; Jim Dickinson on vibes
10. “Bacon Fat“ - (Andre Williams, Devora Brown) - 4:19
  - Willy DeVille on vocals; Roger Hawkins on drums; David Hood on bass; Jack Holder on guitar; Luther Dickinson on electric slide guitar; Spooner Oldham on Wurlitzer; Jim Dickinson on piano; Jim Spake on baritone saxophone; Susan Marshall, Betram Brown, William Brown, John Crosthwait on background vocals
11. “Time to Time“ - 2:39
  - Willy DeVille on vocals, background vocals; Roger Hawkins on drums, percussion; David Hood on bass; Jack Holder on electric guitar; Luther Dickinson on acoustic slide guitar; Spooner Oldham on organ; Jim Dickinson on piano; Jim Spake on saxophone; Scott Thompsen on trumpet
12. “Chiken“ (a.k.a. “The Chiken Song“) (hidden bonus track) - 0:57

== Personnel ==
- Bertram Brown - background vocals
- William Brown - background vocals
- Andy Cohen - doceola ("Gypsy Deck of Hearts")
- John Crosthwait - background vocals
- Willy DeVille - vocals, tambourine, background vocals
- Cody Dickinson - drums ("18 Hammers")
- Jim Dickinson - piano, organ, mellotron, Wurlitzer, Moog synthesizer, vibes, background vocals
- Luther Dickinson - guitar, mandolin, sitar, background vocals
- Roger Hawkins - drums
- Jack Holder - guitar
- David Hood - bass
- Freddy Koella - dulcimer, violin
- Jimmy Johnson - guitar
- Susan Marshall - background vocals
- Spooner Oldham - organ, piano
- Dexter Milan - background vocals (“One Love, One Lifetime," [Don't Want You] Hanging Around My Door“)
- Brenda Patterson - background vocals
- Sid Selvidge - background vocals (“18 Hammers“)
- Jim Spake - saxophone, baritone saxophone
- Rick Steff - accordion, autoharp, harp
- Tate County Singers - background vocals ("Goin' Over the Hill")
  - Whitney Jefferies
  - Bernice Pratcher
  - Ada Thomas
  - Sharde Thomas
- Scott Thompsen - trumpet
- J.D. Westmoreland - tipples (“Gypsy Deck of Hearts“)

=== Production ===
- Jim Dickinson - producer
- Luther Dickinson - producer ("Goin' Over the Hill")
- Yves Delaunay - mixing (Diam Studio)
- Kevin Houston - engineering, mixing ("Goin' Over the Hill")
- Bob Kruzen - engineering, mixing
- Philippe Le Bras - executive producer, A&R coordination
- Jason "Ozark" Latshaw - assistant engineer
- Guy Peellaert - design
