= The Wild Magnolias =

New Orleans Mardi Gras Indian tribe and musicians

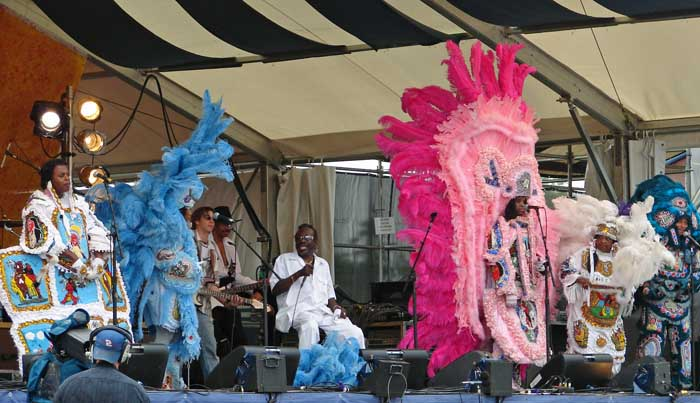
- The Wild Magnolias at the New Orleans Jazz & Heritage Festival, 2006

Background information
- Origin: New Orleans, Louisiana, U.S.
- Genres: Funk; Mardi Gras Indian
- Years active: 1970–present
- Labels: Crescent City, Barclay, Rounder, AIM, Metro Blue
- Members: Theodore "Bo" Dollis; June Yamagishi; Norwood "Geechie" Johnson; Gerard "Little Bo" Dollis; Queen Rita
- Past members: Monk Boudreaux
- Website: Wildmagnolias.net

The Wild Magnolias are a Mardi Gras Indian tribe who also record and play as a funk musical act from New Orleans, Louisiana.

== History ==
=== Origins ===
A group calling itself the Wild Magnolias, participating in the local "Indian masking" traditions and performing New Orleans Mardi Gras music, extends at least back into the 1950s. The group's lead member was called the Big Chief, and at least three Big Chiefs are known to have headed the band for short stints prior to 1964: Leon, Flap, and Joe Lee Davis.

In 1964, Bo Dollis became Big Chief of the group, having previously participated in other Mardi Gras tribes such as the White Eagles and the Golden Arrows.

=== 1970s: Commercial peak ===
In 1970, the group cut a 45rpm single for Crescent City Records entitled "Handa Wanda," recorded and mixed by Cy Frost at Deep South Recording Studio. That year they also performed at the first New Orleans Jazz & Heritage Festival, along with Monk Boudreaux of the Golden Eagles Mardi Gras Indian tribe. In addition to their usual ensemble of vocalist and a battery of percussion instruments (snares, tom toms, cymbals, beer bottles, cans, and so forth), the group culled together a number of local musicians, including pianist Willie Tee and guitarist Snooks Eaglin, as their backing band, called the New Orleans Project. The single received little airplay on radio but was successful in jukeboxes and through local word-of-mouth. On the strength of the single, the group signed with Barclay Records, a French label, and secured distribution of their albums in America with Polydor Records. Two critically acclaimed full-length albums followed, in 1974 and 1975, and a single, "Smoke My Peace Pipe (Smoke it Right)", cracked the Billboard Black Singles chart, peaking at #74 in 1974. Reviewing the 1974 Wild Magnolias LP in Christgau's Record Guide: Rock Albums of the Seventies (1981), Robert Christgau wrote:

"Here's some Mardi Gras music a little louder and jammier than we expect from Tee's Crescent City rival Allen Toussaint. In fact, it's the most boisterous recorded party I know, two sides of dancing fun that wears down only slightly as it slips into 'Saints.' This is not only what I always wanted the polyrhythm kids on the bandstand and benches of Tompkins Square Park to sound like, it's also what I always wanted Osibisa and the Ohio Players and maybe even the Meters to sound like."

At the height of the group's popularity, they booked dates at Carnegie Hall and the Capital Centre in Washington, D.C. Polydor elected not to release the second album stateside, which would not see release in America until 1993. The group returned to New Orleans and local festivals.

=== 1980s–2000s ===
In the late 1980s, Allison Miner expressed interest in restarting the band's career, and booked them on new tours along with signing them to Rounder Records, who released an album of theirs, I'm Back...at Carnival Time (featuring the ReBirth Brass Band) in 1990. In 1992, the Magnolias toured Europe as part of Willy DeVille's "New Orleans Revue" (along with Dr John, Johnny Adams, and Zachary Richard). They can be heard on DeVille's album Big Easy Fantasy. They recorded an album for an Australian label in 1996, and in 1999 signed with Capitol Records subsidiary Metro Blue to release Life is a Carnival. With a permanent backing band, the group began embarking on worldwide tours.

In 2001, Boudreaux left the group as a result of disputes with the group's manager over guarantee payments.

In 2007, the group's two 1970s albums were re-released as a two-disc set with bonus materials on Sunny Side Records.

In 2011, Dollis was awarded a National Heritage Fellowship by the National Endowment for the Arts, which is the United States government's highest honor in the folk and traditional arts.

2013's New Kind of Funk LP marked the first Wild Magnolias record fronted by Dollis' son, Gerard "Bo Jr.," who also now serves as Big Chief of the tribe. The LP also brought Monk Boudreaux back into the Magnolias fold, following Dollis' successful reclamation of The Wild Magnolias' trademark from his former manager. Boudreaux continues to occasionally perform with the group.

Big Chief Bo Dollis died in January 2015.

== Members ==
Current members

- Norwood Johnson – percussion
- Gerard "Little Bo" Dollis ("Big Chief") – vocals
- Queen Rita – vocals

Former members

- Theodore "Bo" Dollis ("Big Chief") – vocals, background vocals, tambourine
- Monk Boudreaux – vocals, background vocals, congas
- Billy Iuso – guitar
- Joe Gelini – drums
- June Yamagishi – guitar
- Willie Tee – background vocals, keyboards, percussion
- Snooks Eaglin – guitar
- Adam Crochet – guitar, vocals
- Earl Turbinton, Jr. – soprano sax, alto sax, alto clarinet, bass clarinet
- Alfred "Uganda" Roberts – congas
- Tom Worrell – keys, vocals
- Joseph "Zigaboo" Modeliste – drums
- George French – electric bass
- Bill Richards – electric bass, vocals
- Julius Farmer – electric bass
- Norwood "Geechie" Johnson – bass drum
- June Johnson, Jr.
- Washington "Bubba" Scott – background vocals, tambourine, triangle
- Gator June – background vocals, tambourine
- Crip Adams – background vocals, cowbell, tambourine
- Johnny "Quarter Moon" Tobias – background vocals, tambourine, whistle
- Tobias Johnson
- Ervin Charles – electric bass
- James Smothers – background vocals, bongos, congas
- Larry Panna – drums
- Leonard "Gate" Johnson – background vocals, tambourine
- George "Little Georgie" Rossi – background vocals, piano

== Discography ==
- "Handa Wanda" 7-inch single (Crescent City, 1970)
- The Wild Magnolias (Barclay/Polydor, 1974)
- They Call Us Wild (Barclay, 1975)
- I'm Back...at Carnival Time (Rounder, 1988)
- Super Sunday Showdown (collaboration with Mardi Gras Indians and Dr. John, 1991)
- 1313 Hoodoo Street (AIM Records, 1996)
- Life is a Carnival (Capitol/Metro Blue, 1999)
- 30 Years and Still Wild (Pony Canyon, 2002)
- They Call Us Wild re-release (with The Wild Magnolias and bonus material, Sunnyside, 2007)
- A New Kind of Funk (One More Time, 2013)
- Wild Side(s): 2015-1991 (independent release, 2015)
- Outtakes + Live 1973-1974 (Tipitina's Record Club, 2026)
- Handa Wanda / (Somebody Got) Soul, Soul, Soul b/w Hold 'Em Joe (Tipitina's Record Club, 2026, 7" companion to Outtakes)
