= Willy DeVille Live =

Live album by Willy DeVille
- Released: December 1, 1993
- Recorded: Olympia Theatre, Paris; The Bottom Line, New York City
- Genre: Roots rock, New Orleans R&B, Latin rock, Tex-Mex, mariachi
- Length: 64:20
- Label: Fnac Music
- Producer: Willy DeVille, Philippe Rault

Willy DeVille chronology
Backstreets of Desire (1992)	Willy DeVille Live (1993)	Big Easy Fantasy (1995)

Willy DeVille Live is a live recording of Willy DeVille and the Mink DeVille Band. It was recorded on June 16–17, 1993 at The Bottom Line in Greenwich Village, New York City, and in October 1993, at the Olympia Theatre in Paris. It was released in Europe on December 1, 1993 in Europe by the French label Fnac Music (the album was not released in the United States) and re-issued in 2012 under title Live in Paris and New York.

Willy DeVille Live was dedicated to Steve Douglas, who played saxophone on the first three Mink DeVille albums and produced Le Chat Bleu. Douglas died shortly before the album came out.

Willy DeVille Live reached the number one sales chart position in Spain.

== Track listing ==
Unless otherwise noted, all songs by Willy DeVille.

1. “Lilly's Daddy's Cadillac“ - 4:32
2. “This Must Be the Night“ - 3:11
3. “Savoir Faire“ - 3:03
4. "Cadillac Walk" (John Martin) – 5:57
5. “Bamboo Road“ - 5:04
6. “Mixed Up, Shook Up Girl“ - 5:54
7. “Heart and Soul“ - 4:25
8. “Can't Do Without It“ - 3:47
9. “Maybe Tomorrow“ - 3:25
10. “I Must Be Dreaming“ - 4:59
11. “Heaven Stood Still“ - 3:21
12. “Demasiado Corazon“ - 3:51
13. “Spanish Stroll“ - 6:11
14. “Stand by Me“ - (Ben E. King, Jerry Leiber, Mike Stoller) - 4:16
15. “Hey Joe” – (Billy Roberts) - 5:04

== Personnel ==
=== The Mink DeVille Band ===
- Willy DeVille – lead vocals, guitar, dobro
- Mario Cruz – saxophone, percussion
- Seth Farber – keyboards, accordion
- David J. Keyes – bass guitar, double bass, background vocals
- Boris Kinberg – percussion
- Freddy Koëlla – guitar, violin, mandolin
- Shawn Murray – drums

=== The Valentine Brothers ===
- Billy Valentine – background vocals
- Johnny "Briz" Valentine – background vocals

=== The Brass Attack Horns ===
- Louis Cortelezzi – saxophone
- Steve Madaio – trumpet
- Tom "Bones" Malone – trombone, baritone saxophone

=== Production ===
- Willy DeVille – producer
- Philippe Rault – producer, executive producer
- Barbara Moutenot – production assistant
- Philippe Poustis – A&R, executive producer (Fnac Music)
- Jules Solo – production assistant
- Rik Pekkonen – mixing (Ocean Way Studio, Los Angeles)
- Ken Allardyce – assistant engineer (Ocean Way)
- Doug Sax – mastering (The Mastering Lab, Los Angeles)
- Claude Gassian – photographer
- Geneviève Gauckler – cover design
- Fred Matthews – photographer

==== Bottom Line concerts (Effanel Mobile Studio) ====
- John Harris – recording engineer
- Brian Kingman – assistant engineer

==== Olympia Theatre concerts (Le Voyageur) ====
- Steve Boyer – recording engineer
- René Weiss – assistant engineer

==== Additional recordings (Looking Glass Studio, New York) ====
- Steve Boyer – recording engineer
- Dante De Sole – assistant
