= Crow Jane Alley =

Studio album by Willy DeVille
- Released: September 21, 2004
- Recorded: Nut Ranch, Studio City; Cerrillos Hills, New Mexico; Mayflower Hotel, New York
- Genre: Roots rock, New Orleans R&B, Tex-Mex, Blues rock, Latin rock
- Length: 35:07
- Label: Eagle
- Producer: Willy DeVille; John Philip Shenale

Willy DeVille chronology
Acoustic Trio Live in Berlin (2002)	Crow Jane Alley (2004)	Pistola (2008)

Crow Jane Alley is an album by Willy DeVille. It was recorded in 2004 in Los Angeles. For this album, DeVille was joined by members of the Chicano rock band Quetzal, David Hidalgo of Los Lobos, and Peruvian Afro-Cuban jazz drummer Alex Acuña, among other prominent musicians. Crow Jane Alley was produced by John Philip Shenale, the third album Shenale produced for DeVille.

== Reviews ==
Professional ratings
Review scores
Source	Rating
Allmusic	3.5/5 stars

Trouser Press said of the album:

(DeVille) begins Crow Jane Alley on a dubious note with "Chieva," an ambivalent song about recovering from heroin addiction, but then turns his attention to romance and gets it all right. His renditions of Bryan Ferry's "Slave to Love" and Jay and the Americans' "Come a Little Bit Closer" bring their own drama and gravity to the material, while such homemade numbers as the convincingly authentic mojo-wielding "Muddy Waters Rose Out of the Mississippi Mud," the surging "Right There, Right Then" and the rustic waltztime "(Don't Have a) Change of Heart" are small strokes of heartfelt majesty.

Richard Marcus said of the album, “Crow Jane Alley is the work of an artist who after thirty plus years in the business still has the ability to surprise and delight his listeners. Listening to this disc only confirms that Willy DeVille is one of the greats who have been ignored for too long.

Allmusic said, "Crow Jane Alley is a very respectable collection from this journeyman, starting off with the single 'Chieva' and continuing with DeVille's novel exploration of sound and clever merging of styles."

Uncut said, "DeVille continues to excel at conjuring new tricks from old genres — Drifters-scented barrio pop, booming melodrama and accordion-laced trysts are rendered with verve and sensitivity. An ill-conceived Tom Waits/Captain Beefheart-style Muddy Waters tribute and the dreary "Slave To Love" apart, a welcome slice of swamp-pop heaven."

== Other information ==
DeVille said about the song "Slave to Love": "What I usually do is try to shoot for the heart. And that song said that to me. It shot straight to my heart. I fell in love with the song so I could do no wrong with it."

== Track listing ==
Unless otherwise noted, all songs by Willy DeVille.

1. "Chieva" - 4:40
  - Willy DeVille on vocals, background vocals; John Philip Shenale on Chamberlin, loops, ARP string ensemble, Wurlitzer Sideman; Josh Sklair on guitar; David Hidalgo on bajo sexto; David J. Keyes on electric bass and background vocals; Hook Herrera on harmonica; Joey Waronker on drums; Alex Acuña on timbales, shaker; Billy Valentine, John Valentine, and Nina DeVille on background vocals
2. "Right There, Right Then" - 4:24
  - Willy DeVille on vocals; John Philip Shenale on Hammond A11 organ; Josh Sklair on twelve string guitar; David J. Keyes on bass, background vocals; Joey Waronker on drums
3. "Downside of Town" - 3:10
  - Willy DeVille on vocals, background vocals; Quetzal Flores on bajo muta, jarana, jawbone; David Hidalgo on accordion; Josh Sklair on guitar; César Augusto Castro González on Leona; Martha González on cajón, tarima; Alex Acuña on castanets, tambourine stick
4. "My Forever Came Today" - 4:15
  - Willy DeVille on vocals; John Philip Shenale on Chamberlin piano, loops, strings; Josh Sklair on guitars; David J. Keyes on bass; Joey Waronker on drums, Billy Valentine, John Valentine on background vocals
5. "Crow Jane Alley" - 3:16
  - Willy DeVille on vocals; John Philip Shenale on Chamberlin piano; Josh Sklair on Gibson 125 pedal steel guitar; David J. Keyes on double bass, background vocals; Joey Waronker on drums
6. "Muddy Waters Rose Out of the Mississippi Mud" - 4:58
  - Willy DeVille on vocals, background vocals, guitar, slide guitar; John Philip Shenale on Hammond A11 organ, Wurlitzer E piano, loops; Hook Herrera on harmonica; Steve Stevens on drums
7. "Come a Little Bit Closer" (Wes Farrell, Tommy Boyce, Bobby Hart) - 3:25
  - Willy DeVille on vocals, background vocals; Lenin García on acoustic guitar (intro), arrangements; Martin “El Animas” Lara on trumpets; Martin "Baby Face" Arellano on guitar, vihuela; Diego "La Empanada" Arellano on guitarrón; J. Mario “El Mono” Rodriguez on violins; Alex Acuña on cowbell, güiro; Billy Valentine, John Valentine on background vocals
8. "Slave to Love" (Bryan Ferry) - 4:31
  - Willy DeVille on vocals, background vocals; John Philip Shenale on piano, synthesizer, loops, samplers; Josh Sklair on guitar, energy bow; David J. Keyes on bass; Joey Waronker on drums; Billy Valentine, John Valentine on background vocals
9. "(Don't Have A) Change of Heart" - 2:28
  - Willy DeVille on vocals, background vocals; John Philip Shenale on Hammond chord organ, Marxophone, percussion; Michael Starr on mandolin, strumstick, violin
10. "Trouble Comin' Everyday in a World Gone Wrong" - 6:07
  - Willy DeVille on vocals; Josh Sklair on Fender Telecaster, Trussart “gator”; John Philip Shenale on Wurlitzer e. piano and Sideman, loops; David J. Keyes on bass; Joey Waronker on drums, coin drum; Hook Herrera on harmonica, Alex Acuña on maracas

== Personnel ==
- Alex Acuña - castanets, maracas, clapstick, timbales, cajón, shaker, cowbell, güiro, tambourine stick
- Diego "La Empanada" Arellano - guitarrón (“Come a Little Bit Closer”)
- Martin "Baby Face" Arellano - guitar, vihuela (“Come a Little Bit Closer”)
- Nina DeVille - background vocals
- Willy DeVille - vocals, guitar, slide guitar, background vocals
- Quetzal Flores - bass, bajo muta, jarana, jawbone
- Lenin García – guitar, arrangements (“Come a Little Bit Closer”)
- César Augusto Castro González - Leona
- Martha González – cajón, tarima
- Hook Herrera - harmonica
- David Hidalgo - accordion, bajo sexto
- David J. Keyes - electric bass, double bass, background vocals
- Martin “El Animas” Lara – trumpet (“Come a Little Bit Closer”)
- J. Mario “El Mono” Rodriguez – violin (“Come a Little Bit Closer”)
- John Philip Shenale - synthesizer, percussion, piano, strings, Hammond A11 organ, Chamberlin, ARP String Ensemble, Wurlitzer Sideman, Wurlitzer E piano, Marxophone, loops, samplers
- Josh Sklair - guitar, twelve string guitar, Gibson 125 pedal steel guitar, energy bow, Fender Telecaster, Trussart “gator”
- Michael Starr - mandolin, strumstick, violin
- Steve Stevens - drums ("Muddy Waters Rose Out of the Mississippi Mud")
- The Valentine Brothers - background vocals
  - Billy Valentine
  - John Valentine
- Joey Waronker – drums, coin drum

=== Production ===
- John Carter - engineering, mixing
- Willy DeVille - producer
- Alfons Kiefer – cover art and illustration
- Ron McMaster - mastering (Capitol Records, Hollywood)
- John Philip Shenale – producer, mixing
- James Trussart – custom guitars
