= Freebo =

American singer-songwriter

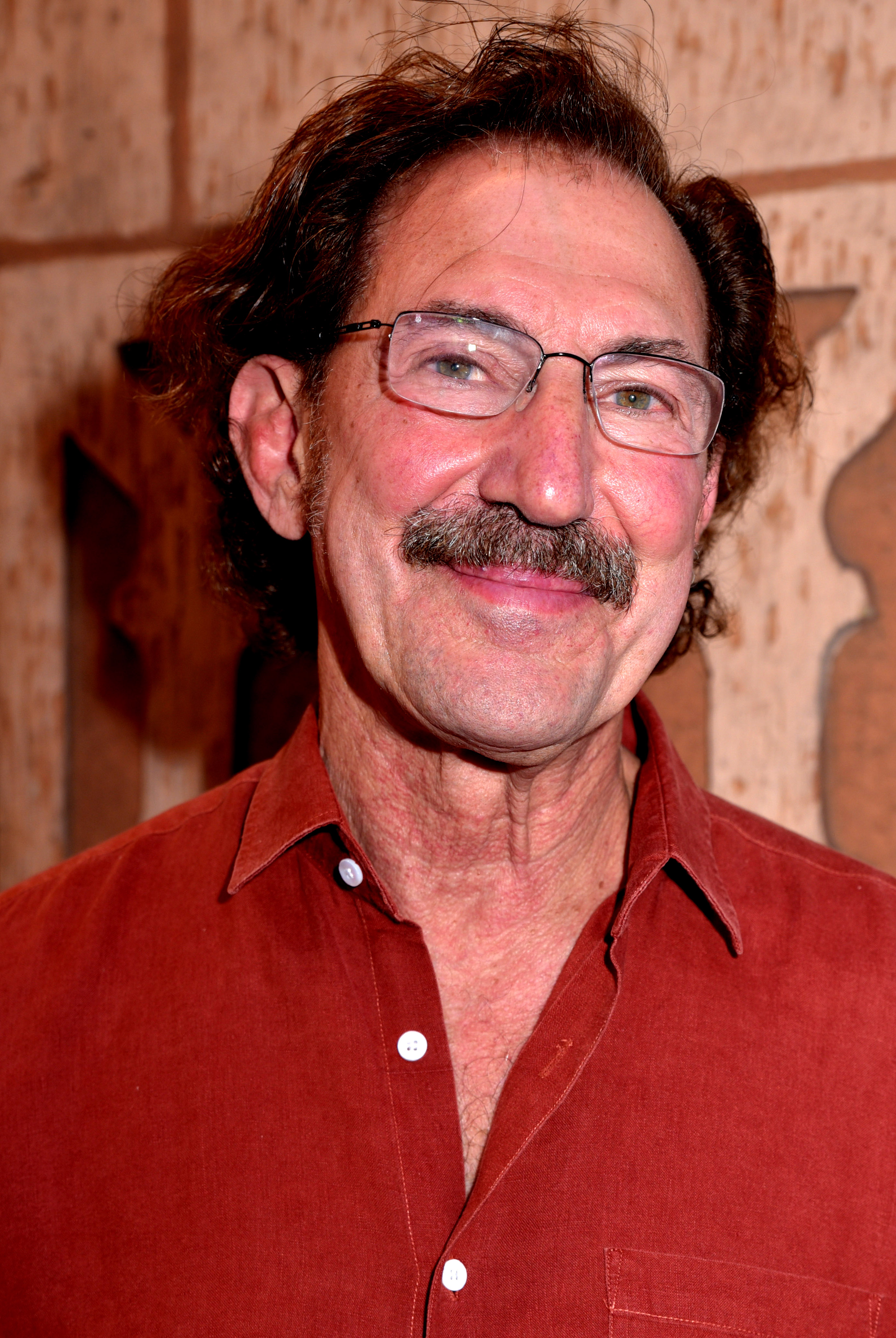
- Freebo in Los Angeles California on July 3, 2019

Background information
- Born: Daniel Friedberg; March 5, 1944 (age 82); Mahanoy City, Pennsylvania, U.S.
- Occupations: Musician, singer-songwriter, producer
- Instruments: Bass guitar, tuba, guitar, vocals
- Website: http://www.freebomusic.com/

Daniel Friedberg, better known by the stage name Freebo, is an American musician, singer-songwriter and producer noted primarily for his fretless electric bass playing with Bonnie Raitt throughout the 1970s. He is also a session musician who has recorded and performed with Ringo Starr, John Mayall, John Hall, Aaron Neville, Dr. John, Willy DeVille, Crosby, Stills & Nash, Maria Muldaur, Kate & Anna McGarrigle, Chicky Hines, Diamond David Lee Roth and many others.

His nine-year collaboration with Raitt (1971–1979) began when he attracted Raitt's attention as a member of Philadelphia's Edison Electric Band in the late 1960s. He played several instruments with Raitt, including electric bass, fretless bass, and tuba. Freebo was soon in great demand for studio work and touring.

Freebo sings and plays guitar, bass, and tuba in The Tribe, a revolving group of Los Angeles musicians and singers that includes Stephen John Kalinich, Fuzzbee Morse, Gary Stockdale, Grant Geissman, Carly Smithson, Rosemary Butler, Marc Mann, Gary Griffin, The Honeys, and Band Manager Lauri Reimer.

In recent years, he has recorded five solo albums: The End of the Beginning (2000), Dog People (2002), Before The Separation (2006), Something to Believe (2011), and If Not Now When (2015).
