= Willy DeVille =

American singer-songwriter (1950–2009)

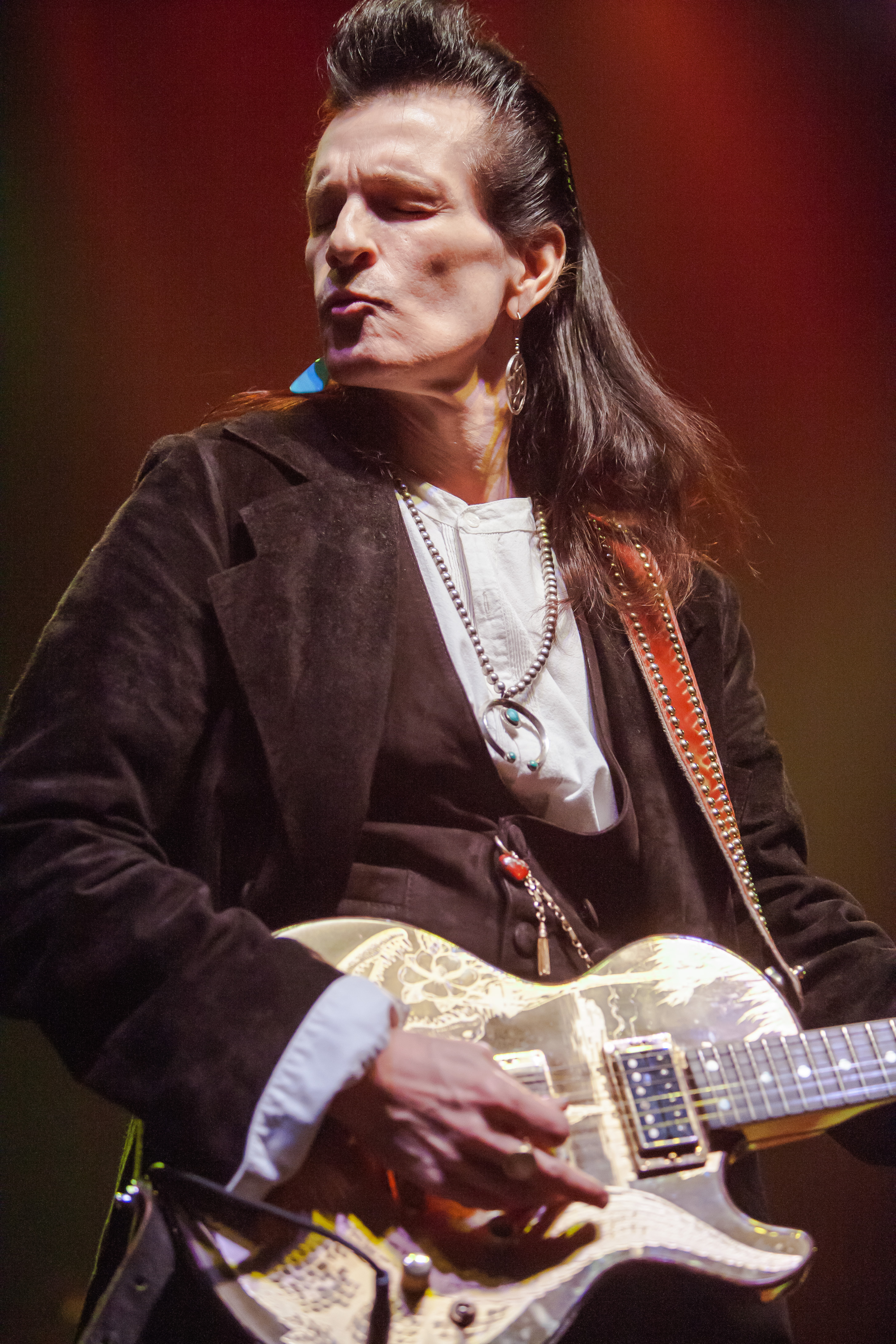
- DeVille in 2008

Background information
- Born: William Paul Borsey Jr. August 25, 1950; Stamford, Connecticut, U.S.
- Origin: New York City, U.S.
- Died: August 6, 2009 (aged 58) New York City, U.S.
- Genres: Roots rock; Americana; soul; New Orleans R&B; blues; Cajun; Latin rock; Tex-Mex; mariachi; Louisiana Creole music
- Occupation: Singer-songwriter
- Instruments: Vocals; guitar; harmonica; dobro; wooden flute
- Years active: 1968–2009
- Labels: Capitol; Atlantic; Polydor; Sky Ranch; Orleans; Fnac Music; Rhino; New Rose; EastWest; Discovery; Eagle
- Formerly of: Mink DeVille; Fast Floyd; Jack Nitzsche; Dr. John; Doc Pomus; Van Morrison; Bruce Springsteen; Southside Johnny; Ben E. King; Mark Knopfler; Eddie Bo; Ernie K-Doe; Brenda Lee; Tom Waits; Los Lobos
- Spouses: Toots Deville (m. 1971; div. 1984); Lisa Leggett (m. 1984; died 2001); Nina Lagerwall
- Website: willydevillemusic.com

Willy DeVille (born William Paul Borsey Jr.; August 25, 1950 – August 6, 2009) was an American singer and songwriter. During his thirty-five-year career, first with his band Mink DeVille (1974–1986) and later on his own, DeVille created songs rooted in traditional American musical styles. He worked with collaborators from across the spectrum of contemporary music, including Jack Nitzsche, Doc Pomus, Dr. John, Mark Knopfler, Allen Toussaint, and Eddie Bo. Latin rhythms, blues riffs, doo-wop, Cajun music, strains of French cabaret, and echoes of early-1960s uptown soul can be heard in DeVille's work.

Mink DeVille was a house band at CBGB, the historic New York City nightclub where punk rock was born in the mid-1970s. DeVille helped redefine the Brill Building sound. In 1987 his song "Storybook Love" was nominated for an Academy Award. After his move to New Orleans in 1988, he helped spark the roots revival of classic New Orleans R&B. His soulful lyrics and explorations in Latin rhythms and sounds helped define a new musical style sometimes called "Spanish-Americana".

DeVille died of pancreatic cancer on August 6, 2009, at the age of 58. Although his commercial success waxed and waned over the years, his legacy as a songwriter has influenced many other musicians, such as Mark Knopfler and Peter Wolf.

== Early life ==
Willy DeVille was born in Stamford, Connecticut to William Paul Borsey (1919–2000), a carpenter, and Marion Elizabeth Meritt (1921–2004). He grew up in the working-class Belltown district of Stamford. His maternal grandmother was a Pequot, and he was also of Spanish and Irish descent. As he put it, "A little of this and a little of that; a real street dog." DeVille said about Stamford, "It was post-industrial. Everybody worked in factories, you know. Not me. I wouldn't have that. People from Stamford don't get too far. That's a place where you die." DeVille said about his youthful musical tastes, "I still remember listening to groups like the Drifters. It was like magic, there was drama, and it would hypnotise me."

DeVille quit high school and began frequenting New York City's Lower East Side and West Village. "It seemed like I just hung out and hung out. I always wanted to play music but nobody really had it together then. They had psychedelic bands but that wasn't my thing." In this period, DeVille's interests ran to blues guitarists Muddy Waters, John Lee Hooker, and especially John Hammond. "I think I owe a lot about my look, my image on stage, and my vocal riffs to John Hammond. A lot of my musical stance is from John," Deville said. He credited Hammond's 1965 album So Many Roads with "changing my life."

== Career ==
As a teenager, DeVille played with friends from Stamford in a blues band called Billy & the Kids, and later in another band called The Immaculate Conception. At age 17, he married Susan Berle, also known as Toots. DeVille struck out in 1971 for London in search of like-minded musicians ("obvious American with my pompadour hair"), but was unsuccessful finding them; he returned to New York City after a two-year absence.

His next band, The Royal Pythons ("a gang that turned into a musical group"), was not a success either. Said DeVille: "I decided to go to San Francisco; there was nothing really happening in New York. Flower power was dead. All the day-glo paint was peeling off the walls. People were shooting speed. I mean, it was real Night of the Living Dead. So I bought a truck and headed out west. I traveled all around the country for a couple of years, looking for musicians who had heart, instead of playing 20-minute guitar solos, which is pure ego."

=== The Mink DeVille years ===
By 1974 Willy DeVille (under the name Billy Borsay) was singing in a band with drummer Thomas R. "Manfred" Allen, Jr., bassist Rubén Sigüenza, guitarist Robert McKenzie (a.k.a. Fast Floyd), and Ritch Colbert on keyboards. The band called themselves Billy de Sade and the Marquis, but changed the name to Mink DeVille the year after; at the same time lead singer Borsay adapted the name Willy DeVille. The same year, DeVille persuaded the band members to try their luck in New York City after spotting an ad in The Village Voice inviting bands to audition. Guitarist Fast Floyd and keyboard player Ritch Colbert stayed behind in San Francisco (Colbert would shortly head to NY to join the band), and after arriving in New York, the band hired guitarist Louis X. Erlanger, whose blues sensibilities helped shape the Mink DeVille sound.

During three years, from 1975 to 1977, Mink DeVille was one of the original house bands at CBGB, the New York nightclub where punk rock music was played in mid-1970s. They appear on Live at CBGB's, a 1976 compilation album of bands that played CBGB and for which the band contributed three songs.

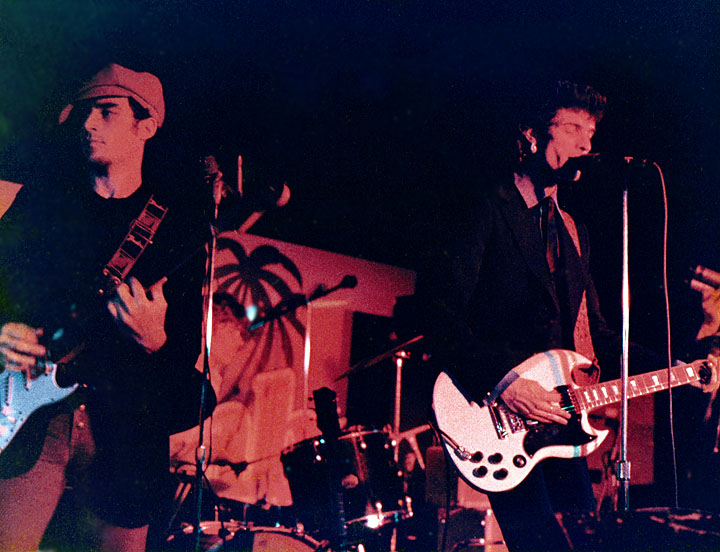
Louis X. Erlanger (left) and DeVille with Mink DeVille in 1977.

In December 1976, Ben Edmonds, an A&R man for Capitol Records signed the band to a contract with Capitol Records after spotting them at CBGB. Edmonds paired Mink DeVille with producer Jack Nitzsche who had apprenticed under Phil Spector and helped shape the Wall of Sound production technique. Assisted by saxophonist Steve Douglas and a cappella singers the Immortals they recorded the band's debut album Cabretta (simply called Mink DeVille in the U.S.) in January 1976. Cabretta, a multifaceted album of soul, R&B, rock, and blues recordings, was selected number 57 in the Village Voice's 1977 Pazz & Jop critics poll. Its lead single "Spanish Stroll" reached number 20 on the UK Singles Chart, the only Willy DeVille recording to ever hit the charts in the United Kingdom.

The band's follow-up album, Return to Magenta (1978), continued in the same vein as Cabretta, except that Willy DeVille and producers Nitzsche and Steve Douglas employed string arrangements on several songs. On this album Dr. John played keyboards and, once again, Douglas played saxophone. To promote the album, Mink DeVille toured the United States in 1978 with Elvis Costello and Nick Lowe. Return to Magenta reached number 126 on the Billboard 200, making it Willy DeVille's highest charting album ever in his home country.

In 1979, Willy DeVille took his band in a new direction and recorded an album in Paris called Le Chat Bleu. For the album, DeVille wrote several songs with Doc Pomus who had previously seen the band play in New York City. DeVille hired Jean Claude Petit to supervise string arrangements, and he dismissed the members of the band except for guitarist Louis X. Erlanger in favor of new musicians: Accordionist Kenny Margolis, Jerry Scheff (bass), Ron Tutt (drums) and, once again, Steve Douglas (saxophone), who also served as producer. Capitol Records was not happy with Le Chat Bleu, believing that American audiences were incapable of listening to songs with accordions and lavish string arrangements; consequently they initially released the album only in Europe, in 1980. However, the album sold impressively in America as an import and Capitol finally released it in the United States later the same year. Ironically, Rolling Stone yearly critic's poll ranked Le Chat Bleu the fifth best album of 1980, and music historian Glenn A. Baker declared it the tenth best rock album of all time.

By this time no members of the original Mink DeVille save Willy DeVille remained in the band, but DeVille continued recording and touring under the name Mink DeVille. He then recorded two albums for Atlantic Records, 1981's Coup de Grâce—on which Jack Nitzsche returned as producer—and 1983's Where Angels Fear to Tread. Both sold well in Europe but fared less well in the United States. Coup de Grâce was DeVille's last album ever to enter the Billboard 200, peaking at number 161.

Mink DeVille's last album, Sportin' Life, was recorded for Polydor in 1985. For this album, DeVille penned two more songs with Doc Pomus. The album was recorded at the Muscle Shoals Sound Studio in Alabama with the Muscle Shoals Rhythm Section, and DeVille and Duncan Cameron producing. The album was a hit in some European countries, entering the top 20 in Switzerland and Sweden. In 1986, DeVille filed for bankruptcy as part of what Billboard called "a major restructuring of his career". He fired his personal manager, Michael Barnett, and announced that he would "put Mink DeVille to bed" and start a solo career. Consequently, Mink DeVille played its last concert on February 20, 1986 in New York City.

=== "Storybook Love" collaboration with Mark Knopfler ===
Although Willy DeVille had been recording and touring for ten years under the name Mink DeVille, no members of his original band had recorded or toured with him since 1980's Le Chat Bleu. Beginning in 1987 with the album Miracle, DeVille began recording and touring under his own name. He told an interviewer, "Ten years with the band was enough for Mink DeVille; everyone was calling me 'Mink.' I thought it was about time to get the name straight."

DeVille recorded Miracle in London with Mark Knopfler serving as his sideman and producer. He said, "It was Mark (Knopfler's) wife Lourdes who came up with the idea (to record Miracle). She said to him that you don't sing like Willy and he doesn't play guitar like you, but you really like his stuff so why don't you do an album together?" "Storybook Love", a song from Miracle and the theme song of the movie The Princess Bride, was nominated for an Academy Award in 1987; DeVille performed the song at that year's Academy Awards telecast.

Knopfler heard ("Storybook Love") and asked if I knew about this movie he was doing. It was a Rob Reiner film about a princess and a prince. The song was about the same subject matter as the film, so we submitted it to Reiner and he loved it. About six or seven months later, I was half asleep when the phone rang. It was the Academy of Arts and Sciences with the whole spiel. I hung up on them! They called back and Lisa (his wife) answered the phone. She came in to tell me that I was nominated for "Storybook Love." It's pretty wild. It's not the Grammys — it's the Academy Awards, which is different for a musician. Before I knew it, I was performing on the awards show with Little Richard. It was the year of Dirty Dancing, and they won.

=== In New Orleans ===
In 1988, DeVille relocated from New York City to New Orleans, where he found a spiritual home. "I was stunned", he said in a 1993 interview. "I had the feeling that I was going back home. It was very strange ... I live in the French Quarter, two streets away from Bourbon Street; at night, when I go to bed, I hear the boogie that comes from the streets, and in the morning, when I wake up, I hear the blues."

In 1990, DeVille made Victory Mixture, a tribute album of classic New Orleans soul and R&B which he recorded with some of the songs' original composers. The album was recorded without the use of overdubbing or sound editing with the goal of capturing the spirit of the original recordings.

I got all the original guys to come back in, like Earl King, Dr. John and Eddie Bo. Allen Toussaint played side piano. I brought in the rhythm section of The Meters on a couple of cuts. We call it the "little" record. It's funny, because I was just trying to get them money, the writers of the songs, 'cause they all got ripped off in the 1950s and 1960s. They were all fascinated, and Dr. John (who had played on DeVille's 1978 album Return to Magenta and who DeVille knew from his association with Doc Pomus) convinced them that they wouldn't get ripped off by this northern white boy. That's when I crossed over to being a local here in New Orleans. We were all pleased with it. It's recorded the way it was originally done back then. It's live with no overdubs anywhere, no digital, no editing. We played the song several times and just picked the best take, the one that was the most natural. It's on Fnac/Orleans Records. I'm really proud of that one.

Victory Mixture was recorded for a small independent label, Orleans Records, which licensed it to Sky Ranch (Fnac Music) in France. "It sold over 100,000 units in Europe very quickly—our first gold disc," said Carlo Ditta, founder of Orleans Records and the producer of Victory Mixture.

In the summer of 1992, DeVille toured Europe with Dr John, Johnny Adams, Zachary Richard, and The Wild Magnolias as part of his "New Orleans Revue" tour. "The travel, buses, and planes and the accommodations had to be some of the worst I've ever experienced ... but the shows themselves were great. At the end of each show we'd throw Mardi Gras throws out to the audience, you know strands of purple and gold beads, and they'd never seen anything like it and they loved it."

=== Recording in Los Angeles ===
In 1992, DeVille recorded Backstreets of Desire, the first of four albums he would record in Los Angeles with producer John Philip Shenale. "I say it every time I record in L.A. — that I'll never do it again, and I keep doing it ... It's crazy. I just record and go to the hotel, and never go out, then back to the studio. I hate L.A. It's the worst. I think they eat their children there. I never saw any kids. It's a pity there aren't more studios in New Orleans." Although DeVille complained about having to record in Los Angeles, recording in that city put him in touch with many talented Latino musicians who helped shape his distinctive Spanish-Americana sound.

For Backstreets of Desire, he was joined by David Hidalgo of Los Lobos, Efrain Toro, Mariachi los Camperos, and Jimmy Zavala, as well as New Orleans musicians Dr. John and Zachary Richard and L.A. session musicians Jeff Baxter, Freebo, Jim Gilstrap, and Brian Ray. Allmusic said about the album:

Willy DeVille's Backstreets of Desire stands tall as his masterpiece as both a singer and a songwriter. DeVille's considerable reputation in Paris buoyed him up to make this disc ... With guest spots by Dr. John, Zachary Richard, and David Hidalgo, DeVille creates a tapestry of roots rock and Crescent City second line, traces of 1950s doo-wop, and elegant sweeping vistas of Spanish soul balladry, combined with lyrics full of busted-down heroes, hungry lovers, and wise men trying to get off the street. The sound of the album balances Creole soul and pure rock pyrotechnics. DeVille sounds like a man resurrected, digging as deep as the cavernous recesses of the human heart.

Backstreets of Desire included a novel mariachi version of the Jimi Hendrix standard "Hey Joe" that was a hit in Europe, rising to number one in Spain and France. DeVille said about "Hey Joe": "The song originally comes from the Texas-Mexico border area ... [T]hey call it Texico. I tried, instead of doing something that sounded like Jimi Hendrix that would have been a cliché, I tried to take the song back to the way that it must originally have sounded, which would be with mariachis. It's classic, but it's classic with a little twist. A little different. I put a bit of pachuco Canal Street slang talking. I added a couple of verses of my own." Backstreets of Desire was released in the United States in 1994 on Rhino Record's Forward label.

=== Continued success in Europe ===
In 1984, DeVille married his second wife, Lisa Leggett, who proved to be an astute business manager. On the strength of his success touring and selling albums in Europe, they bought a horse farm, Casa de Sueños, in Picayune, Mississippi and began living there as well as at their apartment and studio in the French Quarter of New Orleans. DeVille told an interviewer in 1996: "I finally got the plantation ... I just bought this house and 11 acres (4.5 ha). It looks a little bit like Graceland ... I got into horses since my wife is into them. We're raising Spanish and Portuguese bullfighting horses. The bloodline is 2000 years old. She's into breeding, but I just love riding. I've also got five dogs, four cats and a partridge in a pear tree."

DeVille did not have a recording contract with an American label in the mid-1990s. His next two albums, Willy DeVille Live (1993) and Big Easy Fantasy (1995), were recorded for Fnac Music, a French label. Willy DeVille Live was a number one record in Spain. Big Easy Fantasy presents live recordings of the Mink DeVille Band playing with New Orleans legends Eddie Bo and The Wild Magnolias and remixes from the Victory Mixture sessions.

DeVille said, "I was pissed off and I didn't have a record deal for a few years. At the time I didn't want one. I was getting very gun-shy about labels. I was performing in Europe and I was doing great without one. When you get to that stage in your mind, they all start coming around. It's pretty strange the way that happens".

In 1995, he returned to Los Angeles to record Loup Garou, again with producer John Philip Shenale. Musician said about the album: "Loup Garou is subtle in nuance but staggering in scope, it connects the dots between all of the artist's sacrosanct influences, often within the framework of a single song ... All of it is on the money, performed from the heart ... " Loup Garou featured a duet with Brenda Lee; DeVille said: "She didn't know who the hell I was. I just called her up, played the song for her, and she loved it. She had her business people check me out, and they reported that I was big in Europe and had been recording for twenty years. So I flew to Nashville [to record with her] ... That's got to go down in my book as one of the most memorable experiences in my career."

The cover of Loup Garou showed DeVille in turn of the 20th century New Orleans garb posing on a street corner in New Orleans' French Quarter. It included voodoo chants and a song subtitled "Vampire's Lullaby". The singer had completely immersed himself in New Orleans culture. Percussionist Boris Kinberg, a longtime member of the Mink DeVille Band, said about the stages of Willy DeVille's career:

To my mind there were three main eras. The first era was the Lower East Side, skinny tie, purple shirt, West Side Story, Puerto Rican Sharks gang vibe. Then it transmuted into the Mississippi plantation-gambler riverboat rogue, the Rhett Butler thing where he had had custom-made suits, and really got into the period and the clothes and just totally immersed himself in New Orleans, not the present New Orleans, but the New Orleans of the 1880s and 1890s—the absinthe-drinking, voodoo New Orleans. He totally immersed himself in that. Then he left New Orleans and moved to the Southwest and came back as the second coming of Black Elk.

Before moving to the Southwest in 2000, DeVille recorded Horse of a Different Color in Memphis. The 1999 album, produced by Jim Dickinson, includes a chain-gang song, a cover of Fred McDowell's "Going over the Hill," and a cover of Andre Williams's "Bacon Fat". Allmusic said about the album, "Simply put, no one has this range or depth in interpreting not only styles, but also the poetics of virtually any set of lyrics. DeVille makes everything he sings believable. 'Horse of a Different Color' is the most consistent and brilliant recording of Willy DeVille's long career." Horse of a Different Color was the first Willy DeVille album since 1987's Miracle to be released simultaneously in Europe and the United States. His previous five albums had been released first in Europe and picked up later, if they were picked up at all, by American record labels.

=== Epiphany in the Southwest ===
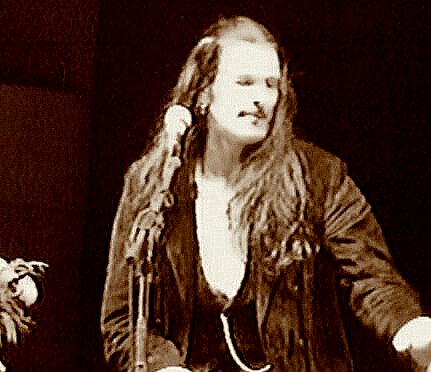
DeVille performing in 2004.

By 2000, DeVille had cured his two-decades-long addiction to heroin. He relocated to Cerrillos Hills, New Mexico, where he produced and played on an album, Blue Love Monkey, with Rick Nafey, a friend from his youth in Connecticut who had played in DeVille's first band, Billy & the Kids, as well as The Royal Pythons. In New Mexico, DeVille's wife Lisa committed suicide by hanging; DeVille discovered her body. He said:

I got in a car accident because I got crazy. I think I was somewhat taunting death because somebody who I loved very much died. And I found them. That's what that lyric in that song means ("she hurts me still since I cut her down" [from "Downside of Town" on Crow Jane Alley]). I cut her down. Next thing you know the police show up, I was in tears ... I was in love with another woman and we were going through some hard times, and I got in the car and I wanted to go off the cliff. I was in the mountains in New Mexico ... They came right around the corner head on. You know how big a Dodge Ram truck is? I broke my arm in three places and my knee went into the dash board ... It was bone to bone ... I was on crutches and on a cane for about three years and I couldn't go anywhere or do anything. I was fucked up. I was ready for the scrapheap.

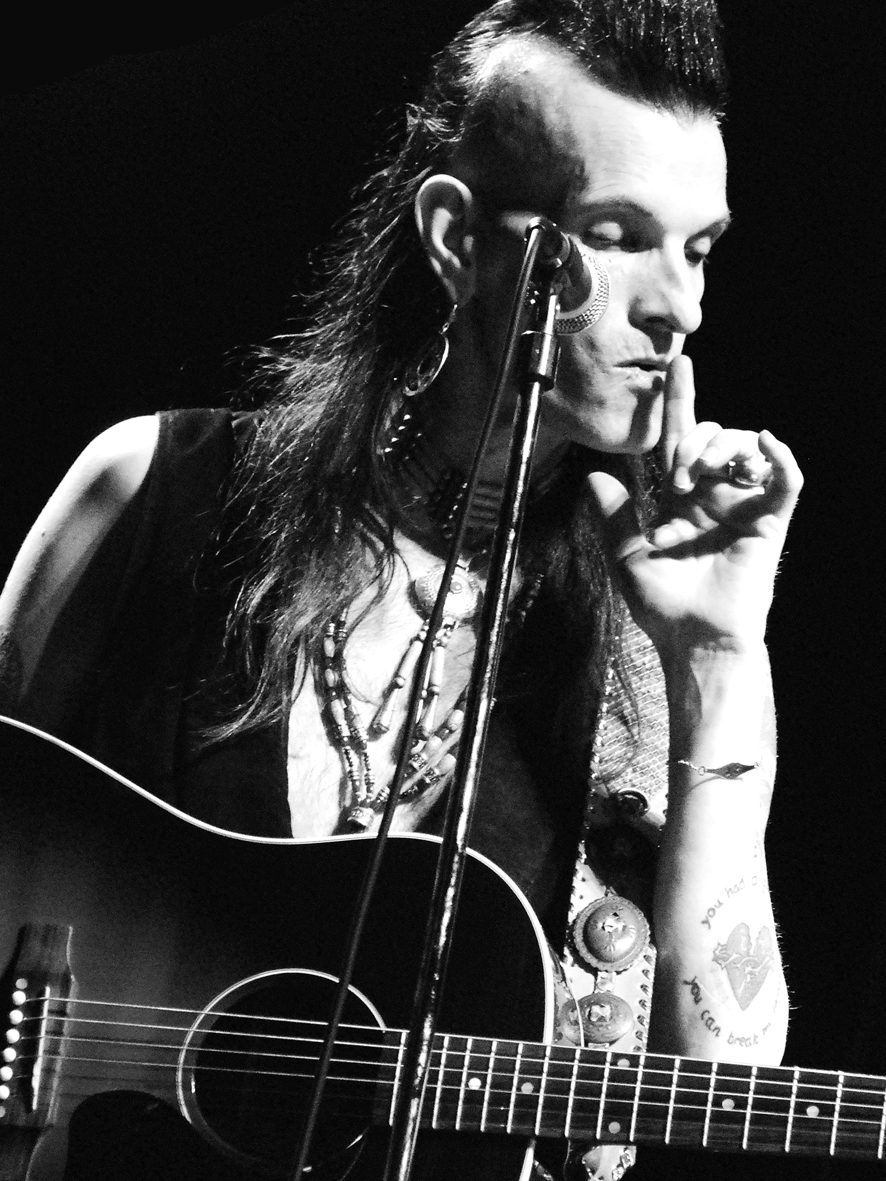
DeVille at the Liri Blues Festival, Italy, in 2007

"I guess I was testing the waters to see if I would live through it", DeVille told another interviewer. "It was a foolish, foolish thing to do." For the next five years, DeVille walked with a cane and performed sitting on a barstool, until he had hip replacement surgery in 2006.

DeVille's stay in the Southwest awakened his interest in his Native American heritage. On the cover of his next album, 2002's Acoustic Trio Live in Berlin, recorded to celebrate his 25 years' of performing, DeVille wore long hair. He began wearing Native American clothing and jewelry on stage.

In 2004, DeVille returned to Los Angeles to record Crow Jane Alley, his third album with producer John Philip Shenale. The album continued his explorations of his Spanish-Americana sound and featured many prominent Los Angeles Latino musicians. On the cover, DeVille wore a Native American headdress and breastplate. Richard Marcus said of the album, "Crow Jane Alley is the work of an artist who after thirty plus years in the business still has the ability to surprise and delight his listeners. Listening to this disc only confirms that Willy DeVille is one of the greats who have been ignored for too long."

=== Return to New York City ===
After living for 15 years in New Orleans and the Southwest, DeVille returned to New York City in 2003, where he took up residence with Nina Lagerwall, his third wife. He continued touring Europe, usually playing music festivals in the summer.

On Mardi Gras of 2008, Pistola, DeVille's sixteenth album, was released. Independent Music said about the album: "(Willy DeVille) has never been more artistically potent than on Pistola, confronting the demons of his past with an impressive lyrical honesty and unexpectedly diverse musical imagination."

In 2023, the film Heaven Stood Still: The Incarnations Of Willy DeVille by director Larry Locke premiered.

== Personal life ==
Willy DeVille was married in 1971 to Susan Berle (February 19, 1950 – August 12, 2004), who was known as Toots Deville. Toots and Willy had known each other while growing up in Stamford, Connecticut. They were married in 1971, and he adopted her son. Alex Halberstadt, Doc Pomus's biographer, wrote about Toots, "Half French and half Pima Indian, Toots favored a pair of nose rings, snow-white kabuki make-up and a Ronettes-style beehive the color of tar. She'd once put out a lit Marlboro in a woman's eye just for staring at Willy."

In 1984, DeVille married his second wife, Lisa Leggett, whom he met in California. She became his business manager. They lived near New Orleans and on a horse farm in Picayune, Mississippi. After her suicide in 2001, he married Nina Lagerwall (daughter of Sture Lagerwall), his third wife, whom he met in New York in August 2000. They returned to New York City, where he spent the rest of his life.

== Death and legacy ==
In February 2009, DeVille was diagnosed with Hepatitis C, and in May of that year doctors discovered pancreatic cancer in the course of his Hepatitis C treatment. He died in New York City in the late hours of August 6, 2009, three weeks shy of his 59th birthday.

About his legacy, DeVille told an interviewer, "I have a theory. I know that I'll sell much more records when I'm dead. It isn't very pleasant, but I have to get used to this idea."

Jack Nitzsche said that DeVille was the best singer he had ever worked with.

Critic Robert Palmer wrote about him in 1980, "Mr. DeVille is a magnetic performer, but his macho stage presence camouflages an acute musical intelligence; his songs and arrangements are rich in ethnic rhythms and blues echoes, the most disparate stylistic references, yet they flow seamlessly and hang together solidly. He embodies (New York's) tangle of cultural contradictions while making music that's both idiomatic, in the broadest sense, and utterly original."

In a 2015 interview, Bob Dylan suggested DeVille should be in the Rock and Roll Hall of Fame: "(DeVille) stood out, his voice and presentation ought to have gotten him in there by now."

Critic Thom Jurek said about him, "His catalog is more diverse than virtually any other modern performer. The genre span of the songs he's written is staggering. From early rock and rhythm and blues styles, to Delta-styled blues, from Cajun music to New Orleans second line, from Latin-tinged folk to punky salseros, to elegant orchestral ballads—few people could write a love song like DeVille. He was the embodiment of rock and roll's romance, its theater, its style, its drama, camp, and danger."

His sometime collaborator Mark Knopfler said of DeVille, "Willy had an enormous range. The songs he wrote were original, romantic and straight from the heart."

Thom Jurek wrote about him after his death, "Willy DeVille is America's loss even if America doesn't know it yet. The reason is simple: Like the very best rock and roll writers and performers in our history, he's one of the very few who got it right; he understood what made a three-minute song great, and why it mattered—because it mattered to him. He lived and died with the audience in his shows, and he gave them something to remember when they left the theater, because he meant every single word of every song as he performed it. Europeans like that. In this jingoistic age of American pride, perhaps we can revisit our own true love of rock and roll by discovering Willy DeVille for the first time—or, at the very least, remember him for what he really was: an American original. The mythos and pathos in his songs, his voice, and his performances were born in these streets and cities and then given to the world who appreciated him much more than we did."

Singer Peter Wolf of the J. Geils Band said about him, "He had all the roots of music that I love and had this whole street thing of R&B – just the whole gestalt ... He was just a tremendous talent; a true artist in the sense that he never compromised. He had a special vision and remained true to it."

Writing in the Wall Street Journal about the posthumous release of DeVille's Come a Little Bit Closer: The Best of Willy DeVille Live (2011), Marc Meyers declared, "There was creative heat and pain in Mr. DeVille's eerie, edgy look and sound. While his punk-roadhouse fusion sailed over the heads of many at home, his approach inspired many British pop invaders of the 1980s, including Tears for Fears, Human League and Culture Club ... He was a punk eclectic with a heart of golden oldies and Joe Cocker's pipes. A seedy sophisticate, Mr. DeVille was decades ahead of his time."

In 2022 the documentary Heaven Stood Still: The Incarnations of Willy DeVille was released portraying his life and music.

== Discography ==
With Mink DeVille:

- 1977: Cabretta (in Europe); Mink Deville (in the U.S.) (Capitol)
- 1978: Return to Magenta (Capitol)
- 1980: Le Chat Bleu (Capitol)
- 1981: Coup de Grâce (Atlantic)
- 1983: Where Angels Fear to Tread (Atlantic)
- 1985: Sportin' Life (Polydor; Atlantic)

As Willy DeVille:

- 1987: Miracle (Polydor)
- 1990: Victory Mixture (Sky Ranch; Orleans Records)
- 1992: Backstreets of Desire (FNAC Music; Forward/Rhino, 1994)
- 1993: Willy DeVille Live (FNAC Music)
- 1995: Big Easy Fantasy (New Rose)
- 1995: Loup Garou (EastWest; Discovery, 1996)
- 1999: Horse of a Different Color (EastWest)
- 2002: Acoustic Trio Live in Berlin (Eagle)
- 2004: Crow Jane Alley (Eagle)
- 2008: Pistola (Eagle)
