= Willy DeVille discography =

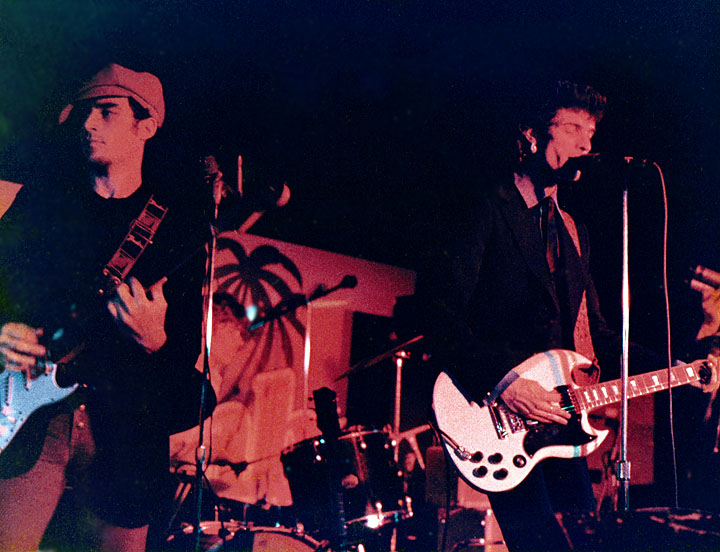
- Willy DeVille (right) performing with his band Mink DeVille at the El Mocambo in 1977.
- Studio albums: 14
- Extended plays: 1
- Live albums: 3
- Compilation albums: 15
- Singles: 30
- Video albums: 7
- Other albums: 11

The discography of American singer and songwriter Willy DeVille includes, as well as his solo recordings, recordings released by his band Mink DeVille in the period from 1977 to 1985. It consists of fourteen studio albums, three live albums, fifteen compilation albums, twenty-two singles, and one extended play (EP).

== Albums ==
=== Studio albums ===
Year	Title	Peak chart positions										Artist
Year	Title	USA	AUS	AUT	CHE	FRA	GER	NLD	NOR	NZL	SWE	Artist
1977	Cabretta (Europe) Mink DeVille (U.S./Australia)	186	86	—	—	—	—	—	—	15	—	Mink DeVille
1978	Return to Magenta	126	76	—	—	—	—	—	—	—	—	Mink DeVille
1980	Le Chat Bleu	163	—	—	—	—	—	—	—	32	30	Mink DeVille
1981	Coup de Grâce	161	100	—	—	—	—	16	32	—	22	Mink DeVille
1983	Where Angels Fear to Tread	—	—	—	—	—	23	15	—	—	15	Mink DeVille
1985	Sportin' Life	—	72	—	14	—	24	22	—	—	17	Mink DeVille
1987	Miracle	—	73	—	—	—	—	26	—	24	21	Willy DeVille
1990	Victory Mixture	—	—	—	—	—	—	53	—	—	—	Willy DeVille
1992	Backstreets of Desire	—	—	—	—	—	65	18	—	—	—	Willy DeVille
1995	Big Easy Fantasy	—	—	—	—	—	—	—	—	—	—	Willy DeVille
1995	Loup Garou	—	—	46	36	—	50	55	—	—	—	Willy DeVille
1999	Horse of a Different Color	—	—	—	—	—	29	70	—	—	59	Willy DeVille
2004	Crow Jane Alley	—	—	72	57	163	46	42	—	—	—	Willy DeVille
2008	Pistola	—	—	—	78	189	25	37	—	—	59	Willy DeVille
"—" denotes releases that did not chart.

=== Live albums ===
Year	Title	Peak chart positions			Artist
Year	Title	CHE	GER	NLD	Artist
1993	Willy DeVille Live	34	65	40	Willy DeVille
2002	Acoustic Trio Live in Berlin	—	86	—	Willy DeVille
2011	Come a Little Bit Closer: The Best of Willy DeVille Live	—	—	—	Willy DeVille
2011	Willy DeVille – Unplugged in Berlin	—	—	—	Willy DeVille
2012	Willy DeVille – Live at the Metropol • Berlin	—	—	—	Willy DeVille
"—" denotes releases that did not chart.

=== Compilation albums ===
Year	Title	Peak chart positions	Label	Artist
Year	Title	GER	Label	Artist
1981	Savoir faire	—	Capitol	Mink DeVille
1993	Spanish Stroll 1977-1987	—	Disky, Raven	Mink DeVille
1995	Les inoubliables de Willy DeVille	—	Wagram	Willy DeVille
1996	Love & Emotion: The Atlantic Years	54	Atlantic	Mink DeVille (Note: Although released as a Willy DeVille compilation, all material is drawn from the albums released under the Mink DeVille band name.)
1996	Mink/Willy DeVille Greatest Hits	—	EMI	Mink DeVille
1996	Spanish Stroll	—	Disky	Mink DeVille
1996	Best of Willy DeVille	—	Arcade	Willy DeVille
1997	His Greatest Hits	—	Arcade	Mink DeVille
1997	Premium Gold Collection	—	EMI	Mink DeVille
1997	The Best of Mink DeVille	—	EMI	Mink DeVille
1999	Collection légende	—	Wagram	Willy DeVille
2001	Cadillac Walk: The Mink DeVille Collection	—	Capitol	Mink DeVille
2003	Greatest Hits	—	EMI	Mink DeVille
2005	Mink DeVille	—	Disky	Mink DeVille
2009	Introducing Willy DeVille	—	Edel	Willy DeVille
2015	Collected (1976-2009)	—	Universal Music	Willy DeVille & Mink DeVille
"—" denotes releases that did not chart.

=== Extended plays ===
Year	Title	Label	Artist
1983	Each Song Is a Beat of My Heart	Atlantic	Mink DeVille

== Singles ==
Year	Title	Peak chart positions						Album	Artist
Year	Title	USA	UK	FRA	GER	NLD	NZL	Album	Artist
1977	"Spanish Stroll"	—	20	—	—	4	25	Cabretta	Mink DeVille
1977	"Little Girl"	—	—	—	—	—	—	Cabretta	Mink DeVille
1977	"Cadillac Walk"	—	—	—	—	—	—	Cabretta	Mink DeVille
1978	"Just Your Friends"	—	—	—	—	47	—	Return to Magenta	Mink DeVille
1978	"Guardian Angel"	—	—	—	—	—	—	Return to Magenta	Mink DeVille
1979	"Soul Twist"	—	—	—	—	—	—	Return to Magenta	Mink DeVille
1980	"Mazurka"	—	—	—	—	43	—	Le Chat Bleu	Mink DeVille
1980	"This Must Be the Night"	—	—	—	—	—	—	Le Chat Bleu	Mink DeVille
1980	"Lipstick Traces"	—	—	—	—	—	—	Le Chat Bleu	Mink DeVille
1980	"Bad Boy"	—	—	—	—	—	—	Le Chat Bleu	Mink DeVille
1980	"Heat of the Moment"	—	—	—	—	—	—	Cruising soundtrack	Willy DeVille
1981	"Love & Emotion"	—	—	—	—	—	—	Coup de Grâce	Mink DeVille
1981	"You Better Move On"	—	—	—	—	—	—	Coup de Grâce	Mink DeVille
1981	"Maybe Tomorrow"	—	—	—	—	—	—	Coup de Grâce	Mink DeVille
1982	"Stand By Me"	—	—	—	—	—	—	Non album single	Mink DeVille
1983	"Each Word's a Beat of My Heart"	89	—	—	31	48	—	Where Angels Fear to Tread	Mink DeVille
1983	"Demasiado Corazon (Too Much Heart)"	—	—	—	—	14	—	Where Angels Fear to Tread	Mink DeVille
1985	"Italian Shoes"	—	—	—	—	—	—	Sportin' Life	Mink DeVille
1985	"I Must Be Dreaming"	—	—	—	—	—	—	Sportin' Life	Mink DeVille
1987	"Storybook Love (Theme from The Princess Bride)"	—	—	—	—	77	—	The Princess Bride soundtrack Miracle	Mark Knopfler & Willy DeVille
1987	"Miracle"	—	—	—	—	60	—	Miracle	Willy DeVille
1987	"Assassin of Love"	—	—	—	—	—	—	Miracle	Willy DeVille
1987	"Angel Eyes"	—	—	—	—	—	—	Miracle	Willy DeVille
1987	"Southern Politician"	—	—	—	—	—	—	Miracle	Willy DeVille
1990	"Hello My Lover"	—	—	—	—	—	—	Victory Mixture	Willy DeVille
1990	"Beating Like a Tom-Tom"	—	—	—	—	—	—	Victory Mixture	Willy DeVille
1992	"Hey Joe"	—	—	14	—	20	—	Backstreets of Desire	Willy DeVille
1992	"I Call Your Name"	—	—	—	—	—	—	Backstreets of Desire	Willy DeVille
1993	"Even While I Sleep"	—	—	—	—	—	—	Backstreets of Desire	Willy DeVille
1993	"Demasiado Corazon"/"Spanish Stroll"	—	—	—	—	—	—	Willy DeVille Live	Willy DeVille
1994	"Empty Heart"	—	—	—	—	—	—	Backstreets of Desire	Willy DeVille
1995	"Still (I Love You Still)"	—	—	—	70	—	—	Loup Garou	Willy DeVille
1996	"The Moonlight Let Me Down"	—	—	—	—	—	—	Non album single	Willy DeVille
1999	"Gypsy Deck of Hearts"	—	—	—	—	—	—	Horse of a Different Color	Willy DeVille
2004	"Come a Little Bit Closer"	—	—	—	—	—	—	Crow Jane Alley	Willy DeVille
2004	"Slave to Love"	—	—	—	—	—	—	Crow Jane Alley	Willy DeVille
"—" denotes releases that did not chart.

== Video albums ==
- 1986: Live at The Savoy (Channel 5; CFV 00092)
- 1993: From the Bottom Line to the Olympia (FNAC)
- 2002: 25 Years of Heart & Soul (EMS)
- 2003: The Berlin Concerts (EMS)
- 2006: Live in the Lowlands (Eagle Rock)
- 2008: Live at Montreux 1982 (Eagle Vision)
- 2009: Live at Montreux 1994 (Eagle Vision)
- 2012: Willy DeVille – Still Alive (3-DVD box set, Meyer Records #184)

== Other album appearances ==
=== Soundtracks ===
- 1979: Hardcore (Columbia); "Easy Slider", "Guardian Angel"
- 1980: Cruising (Columbia; JC 36410): "Heat of the Moment," "It's So Easy," "Pullin' My String"
- 1984: The Pope of Greenwich Village (United Artists); "Just To Walk That Little Girl Home"
- 1987: The Princess Bride (Vertigo; 832 864-1): "Storybook Love"
- 2007: Death Proof (Maverick, Warner Bros.; AWAR 106172): "It's So Easy"

=== Various artist compilation albums ===
- 1976: Live at CBGB’s (Omfug): "Cadillac Moon," "Let Me Dream if I Want To," "Change It Comes" (Mink DeVille)
- 1993: Brace Yourself!: A Tribute to Otis Blackwell (Shanachie; 5702): “Daddy Rolling Stone”
- 1994: Tribute to Édith Piaf (Amherst Records; AMH 5500-2): "The Lovers” (Les Amants)"
- 1995: I Only Wrote This Song for You: A Tribute to Johnny Thunders (Castle Essential): "You Can't Put Your Arms Around a Memory"
- 1999: The Orleans Records Story (Orleans Records; OR 2311): "Jump Steady Come My Way"

=== Guest appearances ===
- 1995: ¡Vamos! (album by Celtas Cortos) (Dro Atlantic): "Cuéntame un cuento" (half English, half Spanish version of this song)
- 1996: Hogshead Cheese (Appaloosa Records; AP 118-2): "Hymn in D" (composer)
- 2001: A Crooked Mile (album by Blue Love Monkey) (Cracker Records; 634479413025): DeVille served as producer, as well as playing harp and percussion instruments
- 2006: Crossing Times and Continents (Centaurus; 9500017), by Eberhard Schoener and Friends (sings "Yvonne")
