= I Drink Alone =

Single by George Thorogood & The Destroyers

from the album Maverick
- Released: 1985
- Genre: Blues rock, hard rock
- Length: 4:35
- Label: EMI America
- Songwriter: George Thorogood
- Producer: Terry Manning

George Thorogood & The Destroyers singles chronology
"Gear Jammer" (1985)	"I Drink Alone" (1985)	"Willie and the Hand Jive" (1985)

Music video
- "I Drink Alone" on YouTube

"I Drink Alone" is a rock song by American blues rock band George Thorogood and the Destroyers, released as a single from the 1985 album Maverick by EMI America. It was written by George Thorogood.

== Writing and recording ==
George Thorogood wrote I Drink Alone as a dedication to American film and television actor Lee Marvin. According to Thorogood, "I was watching On the Waterfront with Marlon Brando talking to Eva Marie Saint. He’s saying, ‘Come on, have a drink with me. I’ve got the rest of my life to drink alone.’ I said, ‘Bingo!’" He originally wrote it as a country song, and wanted George Jones to record it, but the Destroyers ended up recording it after EMI insisted they do.

The song describes a man who, as the name of the song suggests, spends most of his time alone drinking, and it name-checks various alcoholic beverages. Thorogood says that the song "is about a loner who wants to be alone.", and that I Drink Alone is meant to be a comedy song.

The intro pauses were influenced by J. Geils.

== Release and reception ==
"I Drink Alone" was first released as the second track on the Destroyer's sixth studio album Maverick. It was then released as a single. It debuted at No. 41, and peaked at number 13 on the Hot Mainstream Rock Tracks. It spent 8 weeks on that chart.

"I Drink Alone" is often considered to be one of Thorogood`s best songs, and is played often in live performances, and is included in many live and compilation albums. AllMusic critic James Christopher Monger called "I Drink Alone" one of Thorogood's "high points".

== Music video ==
The video starts with Thorogood riding on a motorcycle with a guitar case on his back, he stops at a gas station, lights a cigar and looks around, before picking up his guitar case and entering the bar at the gas station. When he enters the bar, he finds it empty. He sits down, and starts lip syncing the song. Thorogood then opens his guitar case, and takes out an alcoholic beverage, and glass and starts drinking. The video then cuts to Thorogood playing the solo on his guitar, after which he goes back to drinking alcohol and singing. The video ends with Thorogood taking a shot, when he notices a woman next to him. He gets up, walks to the door and mutters the words "I drink alone" before leaving. The whole video is in black and white.

The music video was filmed in a desert near Los Angeles, by George Bloome.

== Personnel ==
- George Thorogood – guitar, vocals
- Hank Carter – saxophone
- Billy Blough – bass
- Jeff Simon – drums

== Chart performance ==
Chart (1985)	Peak position
U.S. Billboard Hot Mainstream Rock Tracks	13
