= Art Sims =

African-American graphic designer

Art Sims (born 1954) is an American graphic designer and art director born in Detroit, Michigan in 1954. Sims is well known for his poster designs for classic African-American films, including The Color Purple (1985) and Do the Right Thing (1989). He is the CEO and co-founder of 11:24 Design Advertising in Los Angeles. Throughout his career, Sims has committed to promoting and making visible African-American art and culture. His work is part of the permanent collection of the National Museum of African American History and Culture in the National Mall.

== Career ==
Sims attended Cass Technical High School in Detroit then received a scholarship to attend Michigan State University from 1971 to 1975.

While still in college, Sims took a position as an art director at Columbia Records in Los Angeles, where he produced a series of album covers. He continued to work in Los Angeles as an art director at EMI for four years. Sims then started his company 11:24 Design Advertising in 1981.

Among the album covers that he designed were:

- Little River Band – Little River Band (1975)
- Bob Welch – French Kiss (1977)
- Mink DeVille – Cabretta (1977)
- Minnie Riperton – Minnie (1979)
- Average White Band – Shine (1980)
- Stanley Turrentine – Tender Togetherness (1981)
- Lamont Dozier – Lamont (1981)
- Johnny Guitar Watson – Strike On Computers (1984)
- George Thorogood and the Destroyers – Maverick (1985)

Sims has worked with filmmakers such as Steven Spielberg, Jon Kilik, George Lucas, John Singleton, and Spike Lee. He has designed posters for The Color Purple (1985), Clockers (1995), Do the Right Thing (1989), Dreamgirls (2006), Girl 6 (1996), A Huey P. Newton Story (2001), Jungle Fever (1991), Malcolm X (1992), Summer of Sam (1999), Woman, Thou Art Loosed (2004), Bamboozled (2000), When the Levees Broke: A Requiem in Four Acts (2006), New Jack City (1991), Black Dynamite (2009), Love and Basketball (2000), Mo' Better Blues (1990), The Secret Life of Bees (2009), Crooklyn (1994), Brooklyn's Finest (2009) and Black Panther (2018). Other works he worked on are Heaven Is A Playground (1991), The Show (1995), He Got Game (1998), The Original Kings Or Comedy (2000), Skins (2002), Lottery Ticket (2010), Kinyarwanda (2011), Mike Tyson: Undisputed Truth (2013), Dara Ju (2017), War Paint (2018), Maynard (2018), Thriller (2018), Pushout: The Criminalization of Black Girls in Schools (2019), Revival! (2019), On the Trail: Inside the 2020 Primaries (2020), True to the Game 2: Gena's Story (2020), For the Love of Money (2021). He has also been recognized by the AIGA (American Institute of Graphic Artists ) and has been exhibited in a traveling exhibition entitled "Design Journeys," which was a collection of leading African American, Latino, and other minority designers. In 2003, six of Sims work has been selected by the Academy of Motion Picture Arts and Science to be featured in the exhibition "Close Up in Black: African American Film Posters." which was organized by the Smithsonian Institution Traveling Exhibition Service in collaboration with the academy and the Smithsonian's Anacostia Museum & Center for African American History and Culture.
