= Where Angels Fear to Tread (disambiguation) =

Where Angels Fear to Tread is a 1905 novel by E. M. Forster.

Where Angels Fear to Tread may also refer to:

- Where Angels Fear to Tread (Mink DeVille album), 1983
- Where Angels Fear to Tread (Matt Redman album), 2002, or the title track
- "Where Angels Fear to Tread", a song by Disclosure, 2018
- Where Angels Fear to Tread (film), 1991
- "'... Where Angels Fear to Tread'", a 1998 novella by Allen Steele
- Where Angels Fear to Tread, a Green Arrow storyline

== See also ==
- Fools rush in where angels fear to tread, a line first written by Alexander Pope in his 1711 poem An Essay on Criticism
