= Sportin' Life (Mink DeVille album) =

Studio album by Mink DeVille
- Released: 1985
- Recorded: Muscle Shoals, Sheffield, Alabama
- Genre: Rock, soul
- Length: 35:49
- Label: Polydor
- Producer: Willy DeVille, Duncan Cameron

Mink DeVille / Willy DeVille chronology
| Where Angels Fear to Tread (1983) | Sportin' Life (1985) | Miracle (1987) |

Sportin’ Life is the sixth and final studio album by the rock band Mink DeVille, released in 1985. Since the band's third album, 1981's Le Chat Bleu, when the original members of the band departed, lead singer and composer Willy DeVille had been assembling musicians to record and tour under the name Mink DeVille. After Sportin’ Life, Willy DeVille began recording and touring under his own name.

The album was recorded for Polydor at the Muscle Shoals Sound Studio in Muscle Shoals, Alabama. As he had done on Le Chat Bleu, DeVille wrote some songs with the Rock and Roll Hall of Fame member Doc Pomus. Members of the Muscle Shoals Rhythm Section — Roger Hawkins (drums), David Hood (bass), and Jimmy Johnson (guitar) — played on the album. Except for saxophonist Louis Cortelezzi, none of the musicians had played with Willy DeVille before.

The song “Italian Shoes” was a hit in Europe.

== Reviews ==
Professional ratings
Review scores
| Source | Rating |
|---|---|
| AllMusic | 2/5 stars |

Trouser Press said about the album, “Sportin' Life maintains (high) standards with a set of brand-new oldies that effortlessly evoke the bygone era of sweet soul music. 'Something Beautiful Dying' (note The Righteous Brothers reference) is tenderly melancholic; 'Little by Little' tries barrelhouse rockabilly; 'Italian Shoes' is classic bad dude strutting. Apt self-production and a sharp backing band make this first-rate.”

AllMusic thought that the album suffered from overproduction and a lack of verve: "Sportin' Life is for the hardcore fan only, one who can appreciate DeVille’s canny and soulful songwriting that almost gets through this abortion of a production job.”

However, David Wild of Rolling Stone praised Sportin' Life, calling it "the most modern, polished sound of (Willy DeVille's) career." He added, "Pushed to center stage, DeVille delivers, singing with more passion and more personality than ever before... The songwriting is uniformly solid. 'In the Heart of the City' takes DeVille down a side street of Springsteen's musical neighborhood, and the album-closing 'Something Beautiful Is Dying' is a wonderfully overwrought ballad of heartbreaking elegance."

== Collaboration with Doc Pomus ==
In Lonely Avenue, a biography of Doc Pomus, Alex Halberstadt wrote about the DeVille-Pomus composition "Something Beautiful Dying":

If "Something Beautiful Dying" sounded a little like the Righteous Brothers' "You've Lost That Lovin' Feelin'," Doc's take was altogether more anguished. His ability to suggest an entire narrative in the space of a few lines, and Willy's brooding melody, combined to create another latter-day Brill Building standard. On record, the purring synthesizers couldn't dampen Willy's cracked pleading vocal:

Your eyes are still that shade of smoky gray
They don't melt now when they look my way
Such a shame that nothing feels the same
My heart is crying, your eyes are lying
There's something beautiful dying

== Track listing ==
Unless otherwise noted, all songs by Willy DeVille.

1. “In the Heart of the City“ - 3:19
2. “I Must Be Dreaming“ - 4:21
3. “Italian Shoes“ - 4:23
4. “Slip Away“ - 4:06
5. “When You Walk My Way“ - (Willy DeVille, Doc Pomus) - 3:24
6. “A Woman's Touch“ - 3:18
7. “Easy Street“ - 3:30
8. “Little By Little“ - 2:28
9. “There's No Living (Without Your Loving)“ - (Jerry Harris, Paul Kaufman) - 3:21
10. “Something Beautiful Dying“ – (Willy DeVille, Doc Pomus) - 3:39

== Charts ==
| Chart (1985) | Peak position |
|---|---|
| Australia (Kent Music Report) | 72 |

== Personnel ==
- Ava Aldridge - background vocals
- Albert Boekholt - emulator
- Mickey Buckins - percussion
- Duncan Cameron - guitar, cuatro, background vocals
- Louis Cortelezzi - saxophone
- Willy DeVille - vocals, background vocals
- Roger Hawkins - drums
- David Hood - bass
- Jim Horn - saxophone
- Wayne Jackson - trumpet
- Jimmy Johnson - guitar
- Boris Kinberg - percussion
- Micro Mini - background vocals
- Steve Nathan - keyboards
- Cindy Richardson - background vocals
- Charles Rose - trombone
- Harvey Thompson - saxophone
- Mink DeVille Band (Kenny Margolis, Ricky Borgia, Louis Cortelezzi, Boris Kinberg, Shawn Murray, Bob Curiano)
- Joe Elliott, Steve Clark, & Phil Collen of Def Leppard provided backing vocals for "Italian Shoes".

=== Production ===
- Michael Barnett - executive producer
- Duncan Cameron - co-producer
- Willy DeVille - producer
- Ronald Prent - recording engineer
- Charles Rose - arranger
- Greg Smith - arranger
