= Coup de Grâce (Mink DeVille album) =

Studio album by Mink DeVille
- Released: October 1981
- Genres: Rock, soul, doo-wop
- Length: 33:59
- Label: Atlantic
- Producers: Jack Nitzsche, Willy DeVille

Mink DeVille chronology
Le Chat Bleu (1980)	Coup de Grâce (1981)	Where Angels Fear to Tread (1983)

Coup de Grâce is the fourth album by the rock band Mink DeVille, released in 1981. The album represented a departure for the band, as frontman Willy DeVille dismissed the only other remaining original member of the band, guitarist Louis X. Erlanger, and hired Helen Schneider's backup band ("The Kick") to record the album. Moreover, the album was recorded for Atlantic (Mink DeVille had previously recorded with Capitol).

DeVille told The New York Times:

I had band problems, manager problems, record company problems. And yeah, I had drug problems. Finally, I got a new recording contract, with Atlantic, and a new manager. I cleaned up my act. I figured that since playing music with people I was friends with didn't seem to work out, I would hire some mercenaries, some cats who just wanted to play and get paid. And those guys turned out to be more devoted to the music than any band I ever had. They're professional, precise, but they're full of fire, too.

Jack Nitzsche produced the album, his third for Mink DeVille, along with Willy DeVille (the song "Love Me Like You Did Before" was produced by Willy DeVille and Thom Panunzio).

== Reviews ==
Professional ratings
Review scores
Source	Rating
AllMusic	4.5/5 stars
Record Mirror	4.5/5 stars

Dutch rock magazine OOR named Coup de Grâce the fifth best album of 1981. AllMusic said about Coup de Grâce:

The band's sound combined with Nitzsche's timeless production style, which combined with that voice to create a purer rock & roll noise than even Bruce Springsteen's in 1981. The evidence is on the anthem "Maybe Tomorrow," the slippery doo-wop feel of "Love and Emotion," and the devastating read of Arthur Alexander's "You Better Move On," that includes in its soulful Spanish stroll mix a pair of marimbas and the ever-lamenting accordion, turning the track into something that is so deadly serious it should have perhaps been in West Side Story. This was Mink DeVille near their zenith as a recording unit.

The Record said about the album, "Coup de Grâce recapitulates and resolves the themes of Le Chat Bleu in an intriguing blend of soul-pop and razor-edged rock. Its influences are as distant as The Drifters and as contemporary as Bruce Springsteen."

== Track listing ==
All songs written by Willy DeVille, unless otherwise noted.

1. "Just Give Me One Good Reason" – 3:17
2. "Help Me to Make It (Power of a Woman's Love)" (Eddie Hinton) – 4:09
3. "Maybe Tomorrow" – 2:56
4. "Teardrops Must Fall" – 4:12
5. "You Better Move On" (Arthur Alexander) – 3:00
6. "Love & Emotion" – 3:40
7. "So in Love Are We" (DeVille, Roger Rich) – 3:42
8. "Love Me Like You Did Before" – 3:15
9. "She Was Made in Heaven" – 2:59
10. "End of the Line" – 2:49

== Personnel ==
- Ricky Borgia – guitar
- Louis Cortelezzi – baritone saxophone
- Willy DeVille – guitar, vocals
- Brother Johnny Espinet – percussion
- The Exhilarations – background vocals
  - Ray Goodwin
  - Alan Morgan
  - Andy Deweese
  - Joe Mendez
  - Al "Butch" Floyd
- Jimmy Maelen – percussion
- Kenny Margolis – piano, accordion, vibraphone
- Eve Moon – background vocals
- Thommy Price – drums
- Joey Vasta – bass

Production

- Jim Ball – engineering
- Bob Defrin – art direction
- Willy DeVille – production
- Jack Nitzsche – arrangement, production
- Thom Panunzio – production, engineering, associate production
- John Pilgreen – cover photography
- Joyce Ravid – photography
- Sandi Young – design

== Charts ==
Chart (1981–82)	Peak position
Australian Albums (Kent Music Report)	100
Dutch Albums (Album Top 100)	10
Norwegian Albums (VG-lista)	32
Swedish Albums (Sverigetopplistan)	22
US Billboard 200	161
