= Spanish Stroll =

Single by Mink DeVille

from the album Cabretta
- Released: 1977
- Length: 3:38
- Label: Capitol Records, EMI Electrola
- Songwriter: Willy DeVille
- Producer: Jack Nitzsche

Live performance video
- "Spanish Stroll" on TopPop on YouTube

Spanish Stroll is a 1977 single by American rock band Mink DeVille, off their debut album Cabretta. Although the lead singer is Willy DeVille, the song features a spoken word section by bassist Rubén Sigüenza, during the break, adding a Latin flavor to it.

"Spanish Stroll" reached number 20 on the UK Singles Chart; it was to be DeVille's only record ever to chart in the UK. In addition, the song went to number 3 in the Netherlands and number 25 in New Zealand.

In 2007, the song was featured in the American drama film In the Land of Women. The song was also used as the ending theme of the 2010 RPG Maker game Space Funeral.
