= Steve Douglas (musician) =

American saxophonist and flautist (1938–1993)

- Born: Steven Douglas Kreisman; September 24, 1938; Los Angeles, California, U.S.
- Died: April 19, 1993 (aged 54) Los Angeles, California
- Occupation: Session musician
- Instruments: Saxophone, flute, woodwinds
- Formerly of: Duane Eddy; The Wrecking Crew

Steven Douglas Kreisman (September 24, 1938 – April 19, 1993) was an American saxophonist and flautist. He was a member of the famed Los Angeles session musicians known as the Wrecking Crew. As a Los Angeles session musician, he worked with Phil Spector, Bob Dylan, Brian Wilson, The Beach Boys and Ry Cooder.

== Biography ==
Douglas can be heard on records by Duane Eddy,(most famously for his sax solos on the hit "Peter Gunn Theme"), Aretha Franklin, Elvis Presley, Willy DeVille, Bob Dylan, The Beach Boys, The Ramones and many others. He was also a record producer, having produced Mink DeVille's Le Chat Bleu, as well as tracks for Wayne Newton and The Lettermen.

On April 19, 1993, while warming up with Ry Cooder, Douglas collapsed and died. Heart failure was the official cause of death. He was 54.

It became a tradition for Darlene Love to perform "Christmas (Baby Please Come Home)" for Christmas on the Late Show with David Letterman with Douglas's baritone saxophone from the original recording being played by Bruce Kapler. This tradition continued until December 19, 2014, when it was announced that Letterman would be retiring in May, 2015.

== Awards ==
In 2003, Douglas was inducted into the Rock and Roll Hall of Fame.

== Selected discography ==
=== As leader ===
- Popeye Twist And Stomp, 1962
- Twist with Steve Douglas and the Rebel Rousers, 1962
- Reflections In A Golden Horn, 1969
- The Music Of Cheops, 1976
- Rainbow Suite, 1981
- Hot Sax, 1982
- King Cobra, 1984
- Beyond Broadway, 1991

=== As sideman, albums ===
- The Beach Boys: Pet Sounds; 15 Big Ones; Keepin' the Summer Alive
- Dion DiMucci : Born to Be with You, Streetheart
- Bob Dylan: Street Legal; Bob Dylan at Budokan; Shot of Love; Knocked Out Loaded
- Duane Eddy: Have 'Twangy' Guitar Will Travel
- Sammy Hagar: Street Machine
- Mink DeVille: Cabretta; Return to Magenta; Le Chat Bleu
- The Ramones: End of the Century
- Leonard Cohen: Death of a Ladies' Man
- Dwight Twilley: Suba Divers

=== As sideman, singles ===
- The Crystals : He's a Rebel
