= Mink DeVille =

American band with Willy DeVille (1974–1986)

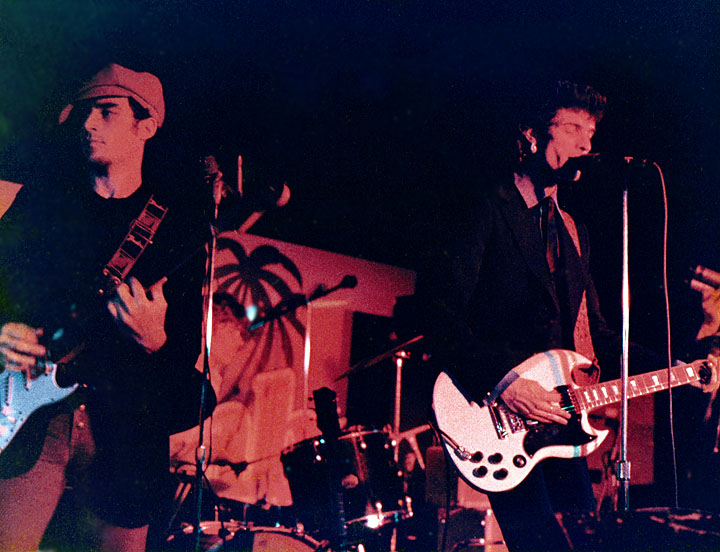
- Members of Mink DeVille in 1977; Louis X. Erlanger (left) and Willy DeVille (right)

Background information
- Also known as: The Mink DeVille Band
- Origin: San Francisco, California, U.S.
- Genres: Roots rock, punk rock, soul, rhythm and blues, blues, Cajun, Latin rock
- Years active: 1974–1986
- Labels: Capitol, Atlantic, Polydor
- Past members: Willy DeVille (deceased); Rubén Sigüenza; Thomas R. "Manfred" Allen, Jr. (deceased); Fast Floyd (Robert McKenzie); Ritch Colbert; Louis X. Erlanger; Bobby Leonards; Allen Rabinowitz; Vinnie Cirincione (deceased); George Cureau Jr; Paul James; Joey Vasta; Kenny Margolis; Louis Cortelezzi; Thommy Price; Ricky Borgia; Shawn Murray; Bobby Curiano

Mink DeVille was a rock band founded in 1974, known for its association with early punk rock bands at New York's CBGB nightclub and for being a showcase for the music of Willy DeVille. The band recorded six albums in the years 1977 to 1985, after which it disbanded the next year. Except for frontman Willy DeVille, the original members of the band played only on the first two albums (Cabretta and Return to Magenta). For the remaining albums and for tours, Willy DeVille assembled musicians to play under the name "Mink Deville". After 1985, when Willy DeVille began recording and touring under his own name, his backup bands were sometimes called "The Mink DeVille Band", an allusion to the earlier Mink Deville name.

Rock and Roll Hall of Fame songwriter Doc Pomus said about the band, "Mink DeVille knows the truth of a city street and the courage in a ghetto love song. And the harsh reality in his voice and phrasing is yesterday, today, and tomorrow — timeless in the same way that loneliness, no money, and troubles find each other and never quit for a minute."

== History ==
=== Early days in San Francisco ===
Mink DeVille was formed in 1974 when singer Willy DeVille (then called Billy Borsay) met drummer Thomas R. "Manfred" Allen Jr. and bassist Rubén Sigüenza in San Francisco. Said DeVille, "I met Manfred at a party; he'd been playing with John Lee Hooker and a lot of blues people around San Francisco. ... I met Rubén at a basement jam in San Francisco, and he liked everything I liked from The Drifters to, uh, Fritz Lang."

Willy DeVille occasionally sat in with the band Lazy Ace, which included Allen on drums and Ritch Colbert on piano. When Lazy Ace broke up, DeVille, Allen, Colbert, Rubén Sigüenza, and guitarist Robert McKenzie (a.k.a. Fast Floyd, later of Fast Floyd and the Famous Firebirds) formed a band called Billy de Sade and the Marquis. "We were playing the leather bars down on Folsom Street," Willy DeVille recalled. "We were Billy de Sade and the Marquis then. We played the Barracks. After a while they would take their clothes off. This one guy—Jesus Satin he called himself—he'd dance on the pool table. It was nuts! Crazy!"

=== Early name changes ===
In 1975, the band changed its name to Mink DeVille; lead singer Billy Borsay took the name Willy DeVille. Said DeVille, "We were sitting around talking of names, and some of them were really rude, and I was saying, guys we can't do that. Then one of the guys said how about Mink DeVille? There can't be anything cooler than a fur-lined Cadillac can there?" DeVille also remarked about the name, "What could be more pimp than a mink Cadillac? In an impressionistic sort of way." Another story about the Mink DeVille name says that it originated with Fast Floyd, who owned an old Cadillac with a cracked dashboard. To cover the cracks, Fast Floyd glued an old mink coat he had purchased at a thrift store to the dashboard.

According to a 1977 article in Creem, DeVille's wife Toots Deville suggested the name: "...the band looked like it might have been going nowhere, in reverse. So maybe another name change would help—God knows the music was great. Mink Pie ... hmmmm. 'No, it's gotta be something slick—something sorta French, somethin' sorta black ... poetry. Mink ... MINK DE VILLE!' blurted out Toots, Willie's omnipresent, black-bouffanted old lady, whose quiet intensity is not unlike his own." This issue of Creem shows a picture of DeVille driving a car with what looks to be mink on the dashboard.

Looking at music magazines in City Lights Bookstore, DeVille noticed a small ad in The Village Voice inviting bands to audition in New York City (his hometown was nearby Stamford, Connecticut). "I convinced the guys that I could get them work, and we climbed in the van and drove back the other way." Guitarist Fast Floyd and keyboard player Ritch Colbert arrived in New York City several months later. Fast Floyd was replaced by Louis X. Erlanger, who had played with John Lee Hooker and brought a deeper blues sensibility to the band; Colbert left the band and returned to California in 1977 and was replaced by Bobby Leonards (formerly of Tiffany Shade).

=== House band at CBGB ===
From 1975 to 1977, Mink DeVille was one of the original house bands at CBGB, the New York City nightclub where punk rock music was born in the mid-1970s. "We auditioned along with hundreds of others, but they liked us and took us on. We played for three years ... [D]uring that time we didn't get paid more than fifty bucks a night", DeVille said. In 1975, CBGB was the epicenter of punk rock and what would later be called new wave, but Mink DeVille didn't necessarily fit in the scene. "Onstage, Willy's band, Mink DeVille, had nothing in common with the new wave CBGB bands that the press had lumped them with," wrote Alex Halberstadt. "Unlike Television, The Ramones, or Blondie, at heart Mink DeVille was an R&B band, and Willy an old-fashioned soul singer ..." Wrote Mark Keresman, "Mink DeVille's earthy, streamlined sound, rejecting the mainstream high-gloss that ruined much of 1970s rock, was accepted by the same folks who'd go to see Blondie, The Shirts, and Television."

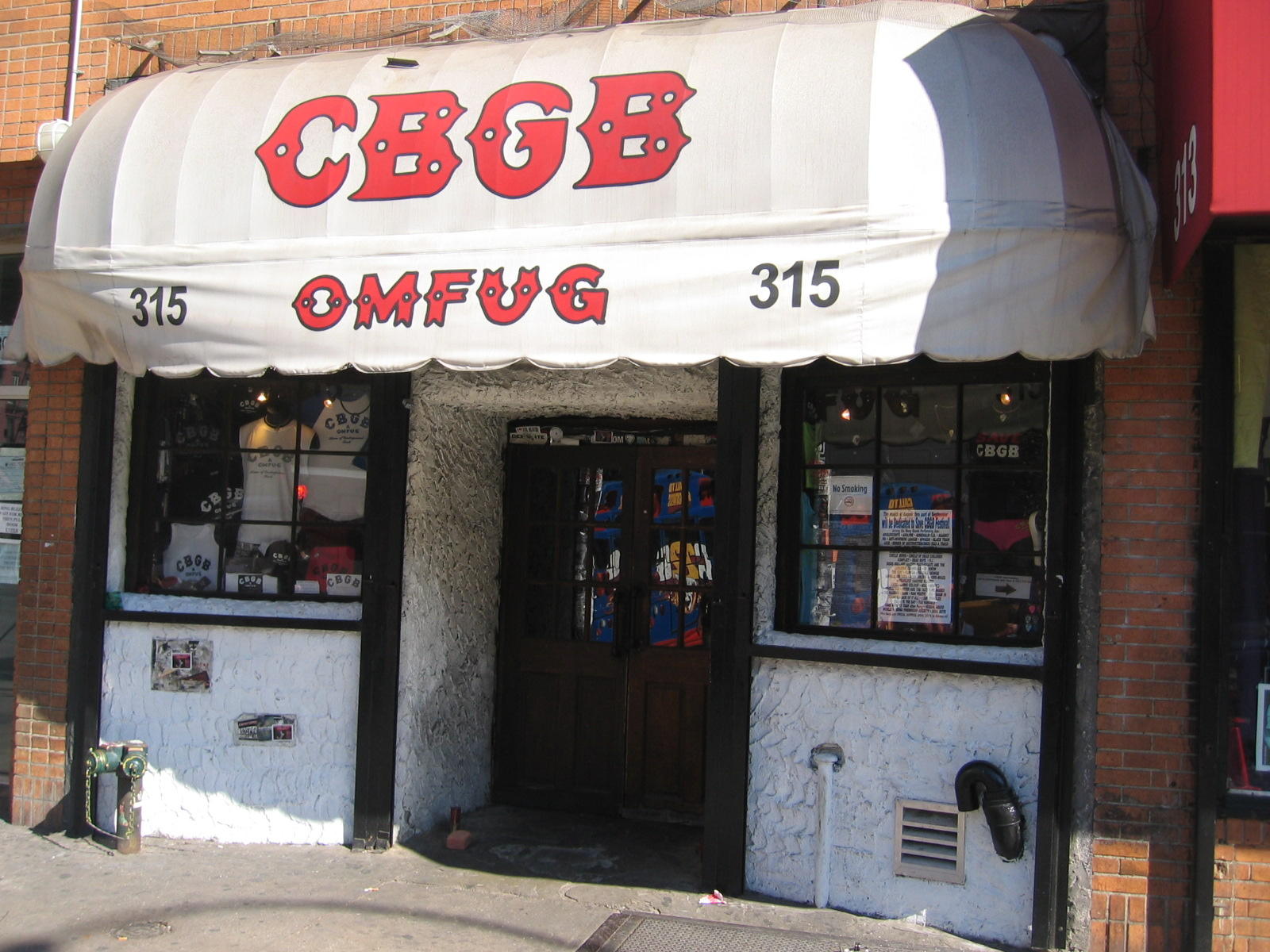
CBGB, where Mink DeVille was a house band.

Wrote Daily Telegraph critic Neil McCormick:

DeVille and his band reached deep into blues and soul, the classic romantic pop of Ben E. King and The Drifters, with a side order of Spanish spices and New Orleans Zydeco swing. They favoured castanets over tom-toms, and accordion over distorted guitars, and Willy delivered his vocals with a sweet, tuneful flexibility that brought out the emotional resonance beneath his nasal sneer. What the wiry, dapper DeVille had that tied him to fellow CBGB resident bands like The Ramones, Television, Blondie and Talking Heads was an edge. He was drawing on some of the same musical areas that Bruce Springsteen's epic rock dipped into, but Willy was an entirely different creature, a macho dandy in a pompadour and pencil mustache, with the dangerous air of a New York gangfighter and an underbelly vulnerability that came out through the romanticism of his music. Springsteen sounded like he was your friend in desperate times. DeVille sounded like he couldn't quite decide whether to serenade you or pull a knife on you.

Said DeVille, "We were doing Little Walter stuff, we were doing Elmore James stuff. The only stuff we were doing that people had heard was 'Please, Please, Please' by James Brown. We used to do an Apollo thing. We played CBGBs for three years, and all of the sudden word got out, and then came this word Punk, which where I come from is a bad word. A punk is somebody who picks a fight with you and then never shows up." In 2007, Willy DeVille said about the bands that played CBGBs, "We were all labeled as part of this American punk thing but I really didn't see any of us having much in common." "Every f----n' art student that plays out of tune gets a record deal," he said dismissively in 1981, when asked about the punk scene.

However, Mink DeVille had in common with the CBGB bands an aversion to the hippy aesthetic (what Willy DeVille called "electric this and strawberry that"); moreover, the band brought an eclectic New York sensibility to its music that the other bands didn't have and that New York City rock fans recognized and appreciated. Critic Robert Palmer wrote, "Mr. DeVille is a magnetic performer, but his macho stage presence camouflages an acute musical intelligence; his songs and arrangements are rich in ethnic rhythms and blues echoes, the most disparate stylistic references, yet they flow seamlessly and hang together solidly. He embodies (New York's) tangle of cultural contradictions while making music that's both idiomatic, in the broadest sense, and utterly original."

In 1976, three Mink DeVille songs appeared on Live at CBGB's, a compilation album of bands that played CBGB (for the recording sessions, drummer Thomas R. "Manfred" Allen Jr. was credited as Manfred Jones).

Later in life, DeVille had only sour memories of CBGB. He did not play any benefit concerts or recordings for the nightclub. He told Music Street Journal: "The whole band only got $50 a night, even to the end. That's why I never went back there. I've never walked through those doors other than to have maybe a beer once. I was down in New Orleans and I came up here, kind of going down Memory Lane so to speak. I ended up on Bowery down there and I thought, 'Let's see what's going on here.' I walked in (to CBGB) and I saw Hilly (Hilly Kristal) standing there. I had a big straw hat on, silk suit. He bought me a beer and it got around to 'Would you like to come back?' I said, 'No Hilly and you know why? Because you never treated me right. You never were fair to me.'"

=== The Capitol years ===
The exposure eventually led to a record contract. In December 1976, Ben Edmonds (1950–2016), an A&R man for Capitol Records, and previously an editor for Creem, signed the band after spotting them at CBGB. Wrote Edmonds:

When Mink DeVille took the stage (at CBGB) and tore into "Let Me Dream if I Want To" followed by another scorcher called "She's So Tough," they had me. These five guys ... were obviously part of the new energy, but I also felt immediately reconnected to all the rock & roll I loved best: the bluesy early Stones, Van Morrison ..., the subway scenarios of The Velvet Underground, Dylan's folk-rock inflections, the heartbreak of Little Willie John, and a thousand scratchy old flea market 45s. Plus they seemed to contain all the flavors of their New York neighborhood, from Spanish accents to reggae spice.

Said Willy DeVille about Edmonds:

There was the Ramones, Patti Smith, Television, the Talking Heads, and us. We were the five big draws. And then one night this blond-headed guy came in to CBGB, Ben Edmonds. He was the guy who was responsible for being the visionary who saw that we were different than they were and that we could probably have a career playing music. So we went into this cheap little studio and did four songs, which Edmonds gave to Jack Nitzsche. I didn't even know who Nitzsche was. Nitzsche did all the Phil Spector stuff that we grew up with and loved. We just fell in love with each other. We were buddies to the end. He was like my crazy uncle. I called him my mentor and my tormentor.

=== Working with Jack Nitzsche ===
Mink DeVille recorded their debut album Cabretta (entitled Mink DeVille in the U.S.), produced by Jack Nitzsche, in January 1977. Nitzsche would, in alternation with Steve Douglas, produce the first four Mink DeVille albums. Both men, members of the Rock and Roll Hall of Fame, had apprenticed under Phil Spector and helped shape the Wall of Sound production technique. These producers were a natural fit for Mink DeVille, whose members' tastes ran to the Ronettes, the Crystals and other 1960s-era New York City bands with their Brill Building sound. Said Willy DeVille, "You listen to that music and you hear those really high strings, and that percussion, and the castanets; that's all Jack's (Jack Nitzsche's) work. All that really cool stuff".

Nitzsche said about DeVille, "We hit it off right away. Willy pulled out his record collection, he started playing things, that was it. I thought, 'Holy shit! This guy's got taste!'" Wrote Ben Edmonds, who paired Nitzsche with Mink DeVille:

It has always been assumed that our pairing was based on his (Nitzsche's) Spector accomplishments, but to me that was secondary. In the beginning I saw Mink DeVille as a hard-edged rock and roll band, and I wanted the Nitzsche who'd produced "Memo from Turner" (off the Performance soundtrack) and the great first Crazy Horse album ... 'How did you ever get Jack Nitzsche?' Elliott Murphy later asked me incredulously. 'I tried to get him for years.' The sad truth is that it took one phone call, and even that was sheer luck—or maybe divine providence. I mentioned my mission while chatting with friend and Del Shannon manager Dan Bourgoise, who responded 'Jack? I can put you in touch with him.' Two days later the elusive producer was sitting in my office. I put on a live recording and after the first song, the band's version of Otis Redding's 'These Arms of Mine,' Nitzsche motioned for me to stop the tape. 'When do we start?' he said. They had him. And that was the whole of it, plain and simple. I didn't get Jack Nitzsche. The voice of Willy DeVille did.

Cabretta, a multifaceted album of soul, R&B, rock, and blues recordings, is generally regarded as one of the best debut albums by a new band of the mid-1970s. Steve Douglas played saxophone, and the Immortals, a cappella singers whom Willy DeVille discovered at a reggae concert at Max's Kansas City, sang background vocals. On the catchy "Spanish Stroll", bassist Rubén Sigüenza spoke words in Spanish during the break ("Hey Rosita! Donde vas con mi carro Rosita? Tu sabes que te quiero, pero ti me quitas todo"), adding a Latin flavor to the album. This song was chosen as the album's lead single and reached No. 20 on the UK Singles Chart; it was to be DeVille's only record ever to chart in the UK. The song went to No. 3 in the Netherlands. Cabretta was elected number 57 in the Village Voice's 1977 end-of-the-year Pazz & Jop critics poll.

The band's 1978 follow-up album Return to Magenta continued in the same vein as Cabretta, but with a twist. "We went against strings on the first album—decided it should be outright, raw, and rude." On Return to Magenta, Willy DeVille and producers Nitzsche and Steve Douglas employed lavish string arrangements on several songs. Dr. John played keyboards and, once again, Douglas played saxophone. Mink DeVille toured the United States in 1978 with Elvis Costello and Nick Lowe.

=== Recording Le Chat Bleu in Paris ===
In 1979, Willy DeVille's love of art and French culture led him to relocate to Paris for a short while. Here he took his band in a new direction and recorded an entirely original album called Le Chat Bleu. For this album, DeVille wrote several songs with Rock and Roll Hall of Fame member Doc Pomus. Guitarist Louis X. Erlanger had become acquainted with Pomus while frequenting New York City's blues clubs and had urged Pomus to check out the group. Wrote Alex Halberstadt, Pomus's biographer:

One night Doc's pub crawl took him to The Bottom Line just a block east of Washington Square Park (in New York City). He sat at his usual table and watched an empty spotlight. Cigarette smoke wafted into the shaft of light from offstage while the sax player blew Earle Hagen's "Harlem Nocturne". DeVille strode out of the wings and snatched the mike. With his pedantically trimmed pencil mustache he looked like a cross between a bullfighter and a Puerto Rican pimp. The tightest black suit clung to his thin frame; he wore a purple shirt, a narrow black tie and shoes with six-inch points. A Pompadour jutted out above his forehead like the lacquered hull of a submarine. The show was the most soulful Doc had seen in ages. Onstage, Willy's band, Mink DeVille, had nothing in common with the new wave CBGB bands that the press had lumped them with. Unlike Television, the Ramones, or Blondie, at heart Mink DeVille was an R&B band, and Willy an old-fashioned soul singer. He borrowed much of his phrasing from Ben E. King and couldn't believe it when someone told him that Doc Pomus wanted to meet him after the show. "You mean the guy who wrote 'Save the Last Dance for Me'?" He was even more amazed when Doc asked whether he'd write with him. "Look me up. I'm in the book," Doc hollered before rolling away (in his wheelchair).

DeVille said about their first meeting, "Now here I am at 29, a writer, doing pretty good and I've just been asked if I want to write songs with a guy who helped lay the foundations for the music I fell in love with sitting at my mother's kitchen table when I was only seven years old. You've got to be kidding!"

Willy DeVille hired Jean Claude Petit to supervise string arrangements, and he dismissed the members of the band except for guitarist Louis X. Erlanger in favor of new musicians, including accordionist Kenny Margolis. Said DeVille: "I wanted to record the album in Paris ... because I desperately wanted to use Jean-Claude Petit, whom I had contacted through Édith Piaf's songwriter Charles Dumont, for string arrangements ... The band with me was a dream come true. I've got Phil Spector's horn player, Steve Douglas (who also served as producer), on tenor and baritone. Elvis Presley's rhythm section, Ron Tutt and Jerry Scheff, want to play with me. Wow! That's pretty cool! Songwriting with Doc Pomus. Not to mention Jean-Claude doing the strings. How can I go wrong?"

Capitol Records released Le Chat Bleu in Europe in 1980, but believed that American audiences would not warm to a record featuring accordions and strings. "It says something about the state of the American record business—something pathetic and depressing—that Willy DeVille's finest album fell on deaf ears at Capitol," wrote Kurt Loder of Rolling Stone. Said percussionist Boris Kinberg, "Capitol in the U.S. didn't know what to do with it because they perceived Willy as this punk rocker from CBGBs and he came back from Paris with a very different kind of record. They didn't understand the record, but they understood it in Europe. They released it immediately in Europe and everybody loved it." After Le Chat Bleu sold impressively in America as an import, Capitol finally released it in the United States. Wrote Alex Halberstadt:

(Willy DeVille) created a record that sounded like nothing that had come before ... It was clear that Willy had realized his fantasy of a new, completely contemporary Brill Building record. To the symphonic sweetness of the Drifters he added his own Gallic romance and, in his vocal, a measure of punk rock's Bowery grit. Doc (Pomus) was elated when he heard it. Thinking they'd signed a new wave band, Capitol didn't know what to do with Willy's rock and roll chanson and shelved it for a year. When it was finally released in 1980, Le Chat Bleu remixed by Joel Dorn, made nearly every critic's list of the year's best records.

The Rolling Stone Critic's Poll ranked Le Chat Bleu the fifth best album of 1980, and music historian Glenn A. Baker declared it the tenth best rock album of all time.

=== The Atlantic years ===
"Willy had found a more appreciative reception at Atlantic Records, where head man Ahmet Ertegun signed him to a fat new recording deal and promised to personally shepherd his career ...", reported Rolling Stone in 1980. "According to Willy—never one to let false modesty intrude on a good story—the Atlantic Records chairman said, 'You got the look, the performance, the writing, you know exactly what to do.'"

By this time, no members of the original Mink DeVille save Willy DeVille remained in the band, but DeVille continued recording and touring under the name Mink DeVille. "Those boys went through the wars with me, the $50 a night bars, and I had to turn on them and lop their heads off and say, 'I love you man, but that's the way it's gotta be.' I still feel guilty about it, but we were just a good bar band. That's all we were. We weren't ready to make great rock and roll records."

Wrote critic Robert Palmer in 1981:

Mr. DeVille's career never quite took off, despite the impressive breadth and depth of his talent. He is recording a new album for Atlantic records, having departed from his previous recording commitment under less than amicable circumstances. And on Friday night he was at the Savoy, where he demonstrated with an almost insolent ease that he is still ready for the recognition that should have been his several years ago. He has the songs, he has the voice, and he has the band. And he has expanded the scope of his music by adding elements of French cafe songs and Louisiana zydeco to the mixture of rock, blues, Latin and Brill Building soul that was already there.

Said DeVille:

I had band problems, manager problems, record company problems. And yeah, I had drug problems. Finally I got a new recording contract, with Atlantic, and a new manager. I cleaned up my act. I figured that since playing music with people I was friends with didn't seem to work out, I would hire some mercenaries, some cats who just wanted to play and get paid. And those guys turned out to be more devoted to the music than any band I ever had. They're professional, precise, but they're full of fire, too.

DeVille recorded two albums for Atlantic, 1981's Coup de Grâce (produced by Jack Nitzsche) and 1983's Where Angels Fear to Tread. Both albums featured saxophonist Louis Cortelezzi and had a full-throated Jersey Shore sound that evoked Bruce Springsteen and Southside Johnny.

Wrote critic Thom Jurek about these albums:

(Both) are truly solid albums—despite lukewarm reviews at the time—showcasing much of Willy's theatrical personality and his own desire to provide for the elements of fantasy in rock music that the early rockers and doo-woppers did in the 1950s and 1960s (and that Piaf and Brel did in France). Rootsy, hook-laden rock, iconic balladry, and the theater of aural experience were all contained in songs that offered the illusion that one could still find acted out under a streetlamp-lit stage, in front of a trashcan bonfire, narrated by one costumed in the decadent attire of a Euro-trash lothario-cum-stiletto-carrying 1950s gang banger ... They captivate a listener in the same way a great period film would—they tell an epic story in a few minutes and capture all of its life and death drama.

The albums Mink DeVille recorded for Atlantic sold well in Europe but not in the United States. Explained Kenny Margolis, who played piano and accordion in DeVille's early 1980s bands, "I don't think the American public had a chance to experience him because in America at that time you had MTV telling you what to like. Europe had not had MTV at that point and they were very open to different music." DeVille said about his years with Atlantic Records, "Ahmet Ertegun and I got along, but we never got anything done."

=== A final album for Polydor ===
Mink DeVille's last album, Sportin' Life, was recorded for Polydor in 1985. For this album, DeVille penned two more songs with Doc Pomus ("Something Beautiful Dying" and "When You Walk My Way"). The album was recorded at the Muscle Shoals Sound Studio in Alabama with the Muscle Shoals Rhythm Section, and DeVille and Duncan Cameron producing. The song "Italian Shoes" was a hit in some European countries, but some critics thought the album was overproduced. Wrote Allmusic: "Its sound is steeped in mid-'80s studio gloss and compression that often overwhelms quality material." However, David Wild of Rolling Stone praised Sportin' Life, calling it "[t]he most modern, polished sound of (Willy DeVille's) career." He added, "Pushed to center stage, DeVille delivers, singing with more passion and more personality than ever before."

After Sportin' Life, DeVille dropped the "Mink" moniker and began recording under his own name. Mink DeVille played its last concert on February 20, 1986, in New York City.

== "The Mink DeVille Band" lineup ==
On playbills and on live albums such as Willy DeVille Live (1993) and Acoustic Trio Live in Berlin (2003), Willy DeVille's backup band was sometimes called The Mink DeVille Band, an allusion to the earlier Mink DeVille. Some musicians who backed up Willy DeVille in The Mink DeVille Band played and toured with him for decades. Bass player Bob Curiano, Drummer Shawn Murray for example, backed up Willy DeVille in his 1984 and 2007 European tours. As well, musicians who played in The Mink DeVille Band sometimes played on Mink DeVille and Willy DeVille albums. These members of different Mink DeVille Bands played with Willy DeVille for ten years or more:

- Guitar: Ricky Borgia, Freddy Koëlla (also plays violin and mandolin), Paul James
- Bass: Bob Curiano, David J. Keyes, Joey Vasta
- Percussion: Boris Kinberg
- Drums: Shawn Murray, Thommy Price
- Piano, Accordion: Seth Farber, Kenny Margolis
- Saxophone: Louis Cortelezzi, Mario Cruz
- Background vocals: Billy Valentine, John Valentine, Dorene Wise, Yadonna Wise

== Discography ==
For a complete discography of Mink DeVille/Willy DeVille recordings, see Willy DeVille discography.

- 1977: Cabretta (in Europe); Mink Deville (in the U.S.) (Capitol)
- 1978: Return to Magenta (Capitol)
- 1980: Le Chat Bleu (Capitol)
- 1981: Coup de Grâce (Atlantic)
- 1983: Where Angels Fear to Tread (Atlantic)
- 1985: Sportin' Life (Polydor; Atlantic)
