= Gear Jammer =

Single by George Thorogood & The Destroyers

from the album Maverick
- Released: 1985
- Genre: Hard rock; blues rock; boogie rock
- Length: 4:33
- Label: EMI America
- Songwriter: George Thorogood
- Producer: Terry Manning

George Thorogood & The Destroyers singles chronology
"Rock and Roll Christmas" (1983)	"Gear Jammer" (1985)	"I Drink Alone" (1985)

Lyric Video
- "Gear Jammer Lyric Video" on YouTube

Audio
- "Gear Jammer Audio" on YouTube

"Gear Jammer" is a rock song by American blues rock band George Thorogood and the Destroyers, released on their 1985 album Maverick by EMI America Records. It was written by George Thorogood. The song is often considered one of their best, and is often played live.

== Writing and recording ==
Gear Jammer started out as an instrumental jam session, both Terry Manning and the Destroyers liked the song, so Thorogood came up with the lyrics for it. Thorogood later said that "Gear jammer is a slang term for a trucker, and it had a kind of cool vibe about it. I started putting some words together in my head, and I came up with the riff at the start."

Thorogood said the title "Gear Jammer" came from a Johnny Cash song.

== Release ==
Gear Jammer was released as the lead single from their sixth studio album Maverick, as a 12-inch single. The song debuted at No. 46, and peaked at No. 26 on the Mainstream Rock Tracks chart. The song was included on several live and compilation albums.

== Critical reception ==
Gear Jammer was received positively by critics. Tim Peacock of uDiscover Music described the song as a "tour de force truck drivin’ anthem". Fidel Bessera of Blues Rock Review calls the song a "hard-hitting bluesy rocker".

== Personnel ==
- George Thorogood – vocals, guitar
- Billy Blough – bass guitar
- Jeff Simon – drums
- Hank Carter – saxophone

== Chart performance ==
Chart (1985)	Peak position
U.S. Billboard Mainstream Rock Tracks	26
