= Le Chat Bleu =

Studio album by Mink DeVille
- Released: 1980
- Recorded: L'Aquarium, Paris; Music Farm, New York
- Genres: Rock, Cajun, soul, Latin, cabaret
- Length: 30:57
- Label: Capitol
- Producers: Willy DeVille, Steve Douglas

Mink DeVille chronology
Return to Magenta (1978)	Le Chat Bleu (1980)	Coup de Grâce (1981)

Le Chat Bleu is the third album by the rock band Mink DeVille, released in 1980. The album received critical acclaim and elevated lead singer and composer Willy DeVille to star status. The Rolling Stone critics' poll ranked Le Chat Bleu the fifth best album of 1980, and music historian Glenn A. Baker declared it the tenth best rock album of all time. The album cover is a photo of Willy's first wife Toots Deville's tattoo on her shoulder.

== Recording ==
Le Chat Bleu was recorded in Paris. "I wanted that (French) sound," Willy DeVille told Rolling Stone. "French records are so much more vivid. I knew what I was going for—this record was my dream."

For the album, bandleader Willy DeVille dismissed the original members of Mink DeVille except for guitarist Louis X. Erlanger in favor of new musicians, including rhythm section Jerry Scheff (bass) and Ron Tutt (drums), who had recently toured with Elvis Presley. Instead of Jack Nitzsche, Rock and Roll Hall of Fame member Steve Douglas, another associate of Phil Spector, served as producer. Le Chat Bleu was the last Mink DeVille album to feature any original members of the band besides Willy DeVille.

Willy DeVille wrote some songs with Doc Pomus. As well as classic rock ("Savoir Faire", "Lipstick Traces"), DeVille delved into Cajun music (the accordion-dominated dance music of French-speaking Louisiana) and the French cabaret tradition for the album. The album includes a cover of "Bad Boy", the 1957 hit by the Jive Bombers. Jean-Claude Petit supervised the string arrangements of some songs. Joel Dorn did the remixing.

In Lonely Avenue, a biography of Doc Pomus, Alex Halberstadt wrote about Le Chat Bleu:

(Willy DeVille) created a record that sounded like nothing that had come before... It was clear that Willy had realized his fantasy of a new, completely contemporary Brill Building record. To the symphonic sweetness of the Drifters he added his own Gallic romance and, in his vocal, a measure of punk rock's Bowery grit. Doc was elated when he heard it. Thinking they'd signed a new wave band, Capitol didn't know what to do with Willy's rock and roll chanson and shelved it for a year. When it was finally released in 1980, Le Chat Bleu, remixed by Joel Dorn, made nearly every critic's list of the year's best records.

In his 2012 autobiography, bassist Jerry Scheff wrote about the album, "In 1979 I was invited by my friend Steve Douglas, the saxophone player, to go to Paris to make an album with Mink DeVille. Steve was co-producing the album and had invited Ronnie Tutt to play drums. I don't know how Steve came to the impression that Ronnie and I would fit in this scenario, but I have to say that the end result, Le Chat Bleu, is one of my favorite rock albums of all time... Willy's songs had a heavy Hispanic influence as well as a hint of Cajun music. Put all of that together with street-corner doo-wop, accordion playing, and Willy's wonderful velvet voice and what you get, in my opinion, is great rock 'n 'roll."

== Capitol Records' lack of support for the album ==
Capitol Records, Mink DeVille's record company, was not happy with Le Chat Bleu, believing that American audiences were incapable of listening to songs with accordions or lavish string arrangements; consequently Capitol in 1980 released the album only in Europe. "That really broke my heart," DeVille said, "That record was my Starry Night. Records are like children; it's like having a baby. Your blood is on those tracks, and you do the best you can. They threw dust in my face. To them the music was too avant-garde. They said, 'We really don't know what to do with this. We've never heard anything like this before.' They didn't even know what Cajun music was."

Reported Kurt Loder of Rolling Stone:

Despite DeVille's indisputable chops, Capitol was less than elated when he elected to cut Le Chat Bleu in Paris... And when Willy DeVille returned—many thousands of dollars later—bearing a record sprinkled with Cajun-style accordions and washboards, an unseemly number of ballads and vivid string arrangements by Jean-Claude Petit (who once worked with celebrated French chanteuse Edith Piaf), the label was flabbergasted, refused to release the album and dropped the artist. Burgeoning import sales finally forced Capitol to change its mind, but with DeVille now signed to Atlantic, Le Chat Bleu is probably a dead issue. Which is a shame, because it's one of the year's most impressive discs.

DeVille told Leap in the Dark:

On Le Chat Bleu we had all these great people involved, you know, and we thought we had something great. I came back to America, and my label at that time said, "Well, we think we should put it on the shelf for a while." This was right before Christmas for God's sake when you know people are going to be buying stuff, so I asked them what the problem was. They said they had never heard anything like it before and didn't know what to do with it. We had Charles Dumont, Elvis's goddamned rhythm section, and they say they've never heard anything like it. I was heartbroken and angry. Finally Maxine Schmidt from my distributor in France (EMI Paris) phones and he says, "Willy what's going on?" So I told him. He said don't worry we'll release it over here. We did, and then it became a matter of not what are we going to do with Willy Deville, but who the hell let him get away. As an import it was racking up great sales here. Capitol finally went and released a copy of it, but never did too much work on it."

For the American release of Le Chat Bleu, Capitol substituted "Turn You Every Way but Loose", a rocker, for "Mazurka", a zydeco song written by Queen Ida.

== Cover art ==
The shoulder and panther tattoo on the cover of Le Chat Bleu belong to Toots, DeVille's first wife.

== Critical reception ==
Professional ratings
Review scores
Source	Rating
AllMusic	4.5/5 stars
Christgau's Record Guide	B−
Smash Hits	7/10

Writing for Smash Hits in 1980, David Hepworth said DeVille "still sings like an angel who's fallen on hard times". Hepworth described the album as "patchier than anything [DeVille's] done before but the delights are nothing if not delightful". Critic Robert Christgau, who had previously called DeVille "the songpoet of greaser nostalgia," did not care for Le Chat Bleu. He wrote sarcastically about the album, "Goils — they break your heart, run off with your coke, mess up your drug deals, and take your count when you go to the blood bank. Rhythm and blues was never like this, so maybe he's a punk after all. But more likely he's one more struggling professional musician."

Neil McCormick, a music critic for The Daily Telegraph, wrote about the album 29 years after its release, "Whenever I am taken with one of those bouts of nostalgia where I am compelled to sit and flick through my old vinyl, there's a very high chance that Le Chat Bleu will wind up on my stereo. It is a perfect album, from first track to last, and how many of those really exist?"

== Track listing ==
All songs written by Willy DeVille, unless otherwise noted.

1. "This Must Be the Night" – 2:40
2. "Savoir Faire" – 3:08
3. "That World Outside" (DeVille, Doc Pomus) – 2:59
4. "Slow Drain" – 3:28
5. "You Just Keep Holding On" (DeVille, Pomus) – 2:47
6. "Lipstick Traces" – 2:49
7. "Just to Walk That Little Girl Home" (DeVille, Pomus) – 3:52
8. "Mazurka" (European release) (A. J. Lewis, Queen Ida) – 2:28 ["Turn You Every Way But Loose" (US release) – 3:35]
9. "Bad Boy" (Lil Armstrong, Avon Long) – 2:47
10. "Heaven Stood Still" – 2:52

== Personnel ==
- Willy DeVille – guitar, vocals
- Steve Douglas – saxophone
- Louis X. Erlanger – guitar
- Jake and the Family Jewels – background vocals
  - Allan "Jake" Jacobs
  - Rochelle "Bunky" Skinner
- Kenny Margolis – piano, accordion, background vocals
- Eve Moon – background vocals
- Jean-Claude Petit – string arrangements
- Jerry Scheff – bass
- Ron Tutt – drums

=== Production ===
- Chris Coffin – engineering
- Willy DeVille – production
- Joel Dorn – mixing (at Regency Sound, New York)
- Steve Douglas – production
- Gerry Gabinelli – engineering
- Roy Kohara – art direction
- Jean Luc – photography
- Eric Migliaccio – assistant engineer
- Nicola – assistant engineer
- Phil Shima – design
