= Maverick (George Thorogood and the Destroyers album) =

Studio album by George Thorogood and the Destroyers
- Released: January 25, 1985 (US); May 1985 (UK)
- Recorded: July 1984
- Studios: Dimension Sound Studios, Boston, Massachusetts
- Genres: Blues rock; boogie rock; hard rock
- Length: 43:34
- Label: EMI America
- Producer: Terry Manning

George Thorogood and the Destroyers chronology
Bad to the Bone (1982)	Maverick (1985)	Nadine (1986)

Singles from Maverick
- 1. "Gear Jammer" Released: 1985; 2. "I Drink Alone" Released: 1985; 3. "Willie and the Hand Jive" Released: May 15, 1985; 4. "Memphis/Marie" Released: August 21, 1985

Maverick is the sixth studio album by the American blues rock band George Thorogood and the Destroyers. It was released in 1985 by the label EMI America Records. Some of its songs are among Thorogood's best-known, including "I Drink Alone" and "Willie and the Hand Jive". The album peaked at No. 32 on the Billboard 200 chart.

In 1982 the Destroyers released their album Bad to the Bone, which they supported with a worldwide tour. In July 1984 they began recording of Maverick, which was released on January 25, 1985. The album received mixed reviews from critics, but ended up selling more than 500,000 copies, and together with Born to Be Bad is their highest-charting studio album on the Billboard 200 chart.

== Background ==
In 1982, the Destroyers signed a recording contract with EMI America, the same year they released their fifth studio album, Bad to the Bone. The band supported the album with a worldwide concert tour, after which they returned to the United States, where they picked a producer, and began recording of Maverick.

== Recording ==
Recording of the album took place in July 1984, at the Dimension Sound Studios in Jamaica Plain, Massachusetts. The album was produced by Terry Manning, who would continue to produce the Destroyers' next several studio albums.

== Songs ==
The album consists of eleven songs, split between seven covers, and four originals.

=== Side one ===
"Gear Jammer" is the album's opener, and lead single. "I Drink Alone" was the second single, and alongside "Gear Jammer" were written by Thorogood. The third song and single from the album is "Willie and the Hand Jive", written by Johnny Otis. The song's last verse was rewritten to mention MTV. According to Thorogood,

I didn’t choose this cover; the record company did, when we were putting together the Maverick album. There were several cuts that, I don’t want to say they weren’t acceptable, but the label wasn’t as excited as I would have liked. They knew we did Willie And The Hand Jive at soundchecks – everybody’s played it – so they asked us to do it. They wanted something kind of recognizable. Me being a company man, I said, ‘Sure, I’ll play ball with you.’ It was more or less their idea.

— Bosso, Joe (March 4, 2014). "George Thorogood runs down his 11 greatest hits". courant.com. p. 4.

"What a Price" was written by Fats Domino, while "Long Gone" is another Thorogood original.

=== Side two ===
Side two opens with Carl Perkins’ "Dixie Fried". John Lee Hooker wrote "Crawlin' King Snake", while "Memphis/Marie", is one of two songs written by Chuck Berry. The song combines the two Chuck Berry songs "Memphis, Tennessee" and "Little Marie." Thorogood also wrote the ballad "Woman with the Blues", and Chuck Berry wrote "Go, Go, Go" (referred to as "(Let's) Go Go Go" on some versions of the album). The album's closer is "The Ballad of Maverick", written by David Buttolph and Paul Francis Webster. The song was the theme for the TV Western Maverick, a show which Thorogood watched as a child. After saxophonist Hank Carter and bassist Billy Blough heard Thorogood singing the song, they figured out the chords, and the band began playing it at rehearsals, eventually recording it for the album.

== Release ==
EMI America released Maverick on January 25, 1985. The album debuted at No. 77, and peaked at No. 32 on the Billboard 200 chart. Maverick eventually sold more than 500,000 copies. The album was certified gold by the Recording Industry Association of America (RIAA) on August 5, 1985.

Three tracks from the album were released as singles, "Gear Jammer" was released as the lead single from the album. The song peaked at No. 26 on the Mainstream Rock Tracks chart.

"I Drink Alone" was the second single from the album. It is one of the Destroyer's best known songs, it is often played live and included on many live and compilation albums. It peaked at number 13 on the Hot Mainstream Rock Tracks.

"Willie and the Hand Jive" was also released as a single on May 15. It is a cover of the Johnny Otis song of the same name. "Willie and the Hand Jive" is the only Destroyers single to reach the Billboard Hot 100 chart, peaking at number 63.

An edit of "Memphis/Marie" was released as a 12-inch single on August 21, 1985, as the fourth single from the album.

== Touring and promotion ==
Following the release of the album, the Destroyers embarked on the "Maverick" Tour. During the tour, the band also played Live Aid with Bo Diddley and Albert Collins, which they followed up with the second leg of their "Maverick" Tour. The Destroyers played tour dates in Canada, also in support of Maverick.

Two music videos were filmed for songs from Maverick. PMI's George Bloome filmed the black-and-white music video for "I Drink Alone", in a desert near Los Angeles. The music video for "Willie and the Hand Jive" was produced at the Fifth Floor Productions in Cincinnati, Ohio, by Ellen Goldman and Maureen Arata.

== Critical reception ==
Maverick received mixed reviews from critics.

Professional ratings
Review scores
Source	Rating
AllMusic	3/5 stars
The Great Rock Discography	5/10
The Penguin Guide to Blues Recordings	3/4 stars
The Virgin Encyclopedia of the Blues	2/5 stars

Cash Box said that Maverick "should please Thorogood’s many fans while set for a long stay on many AOR playlists." AllMusic's Joe Viglione wrote "George Thorogood is forever consistent and Maverick is more of the blues/rock driving sound the journeyman guitarist is known for." Another AllMusic critic, James Christopher Monger, called "Willie and the Hand Jive" and "I Drink Alone" one of Thorogood's "high points."

== Track listing ==
Side one
No.	Title	Writer(s)	Length
1.	"Gear Jammer"	George Thorogood	4:33
2.	"I Drink Alone"	George Thorogood	4:30
3.	"Willie and the Hand Jive"	Johnny Otis	4:01
4.	"What a Price"	Fats Domino, Murphy Maddux, Jack Jessup	2:43
5.	"Long Gone"	George Thorogood	4:28

Side two
No.	Title	Writer(s)	Length
1.	"Dixie Fried"	Carl Perkins, Howard Griffin	3:40
2.	"Crawlin' King Snake"	John Lee Hooker	4:09
3.	"Memphis/Marie"	Chuck Berry	5:58
4.	"Woman with the Blues"	George Thorogood	3:30
5.	"Go, Go, Go" (*)	Chuck Berry	3:28
6.	"The Ballad of Maverick"	David Buttolph, Paul Francis Webster	2:04
Total length:			43:34

(*) "Go, Go, Go" is referred to as "(Let's) Go Go Go" on some versions of the album.

== Personnel ==
The following personnel are credited on the album:

=== Musicians ===
- George Thorogood – vocals, guitar
- Billy Blough – bass guitar
- Jeff Simon – drums and percussion
- Hank Carter – saxophone, harmony vocals

=== Technical ===
- Terry Manning – producer, engineer
- Ken Irwin – assistant producer
- Randy Ezratty – assistant engineer
- Bob Ludwig – mastering
- Henry Marquez – art direction
- Art Sims – design
- Caroline Greyshock – photography
- David Gahr – photography

== Charts ==
Chart (1985)	Peak position
Australia (Kent Music Report)	32
Canada (RPM)	35
New Zealand (RMNZ)	14
US Billboard 200	32

== Certifications ==
Certifications for Maverick
Region	Certification	Certified units/sales
Canada (Music Canada)	Gold	40,000^{^}
United States (RIAA)	Gold	500,000^{^}

^{^} Shipments figures based on certification alone.
