= Toots Deville =

American model and manager (1950–2004)

- Born: February 19, 1950; U.S.
- Died: August 12, 2004 (aged 54); Monticello, New York, U.S.
- Other names: Susan Berle; Susan Martincak
- Occupations: Model; manager
- Spouses: Robert Martin (divorced) Willy Deville (m. 1971; div. 1984): Stephen Martincak
- Children: 1

Toots Deville (February 19, 1950 – August 19, 2004) was known as the wife of musician Willy Deville, and for her work as his personal manager and association with the band Mink DeVille during the 1970s. She was also a model and appeared in rock magazines like Creem. Her outlandish behavior and appearance made her a controversial figure in the music world for most of her life.

== Personal life and career ==
She was adopted and her birth name and family is unknown. She stated her birth family was of Pima descent. Her adoptive parents, Harriet (née Harrison; 1916–1987) and Maurice Berle (born Berinsky; 1916–2005), were a wealthy Jewish couple from South Carolina, and named her Susan Berle. She was an only child and her parents later divorced. Her paternal father was Philip Berlinsky, an immigrant from Poland that started the Berle Apparel Group, which still operates today.

Little is known about where her stage name "Toots" came from. Her family moved to Stamford, Connecticut. She attended Dolan Middle School in Stamford, and ran away from home to New York City, and became addicted to drugs. Her parents sent her to therapy and rehab, and eventually she was sent to boarding school at Windsor Mountain in Massachusetts. She dropped out of school and became pregnant at age 18 in 1968 by a man named Brian, with whom she had her son Sean. She was also briefly married to a man named Robert Martin during this time. Growing up she was influenced by artists like Édith Piaf and The Ronettes.

She met musician Willy Deville as a child while living in Stamford in the late 60s. They were separated when she was sent to boarding school, but they reconnected and later married in 1971 in Stamford. Willy's birth name was William Borsey, and he adopted her son and gave him his name, Sean Borsey. The couple then moved to New York City, living in the East Village, where the punk rock music scene was in full swing with clubs like the Fillmore East and CBGB. Mink DeVille became the house band for CBGB from 1975 to 1978, where Toots was seen often. The two had matching black panther tattoos on their shoulders. Toots posed for Mink Deville's Le Chat Bleu album cover in 1980. Some of the band's early songs mention a woman named "Sue" that was inspired by Toots. Toots is credited for managing her husband's early music career and influencing the punk rock era of music. She would go on tour with Mink DeVille in Europe, and is credited with creating their stage costumes. She was known for her outlandish behavior and drug use. She was very protective of her husband and various media reports stated how she would pull out knives on women if they flirted with him. Toots had jet black hair she would keep often in a beehive hairstyle, and had a nose ring and tattoos, which was still uncommon in the early 1970s. She posed as a model for rock magazines like Creem. Since her death some have compared her to Amy Winehouse.

== Later life and death ==
She left the rock music scene behind her, divorced from Deville in 1984, and moved to upstate New York, where she stopped using drugs and became a health-care worker until she was diagnosed with cancer. She also re-married to Stephen Martincak, and she was known as Susan Martincak toward the end of her life. She died on August 19, 2004, at the age of 54 from cancer, in Monticello, New York.
