= Willie and the Hand Jive =

1958 single by Johnny Otis

Single by Johnny Otis
- B-side: "Ring-a-Ling"
- Released: 1958
- Recorded: 1958
- Genre: Rock and roll
- Length: 2:32
- Label: Capitol
- Songwriter: Johnny Otis
- Producer: Tom “Tippy” Morgan

Johnny Otis singles chronology
"Bye Bye Baby" (1958)	"Willie and the Hand Jive" (1958)	"Crazy Country Hop" (1958)

"Willie and the Hand Jive"

Single by Eric Clapton

from the album 461 Ocean Boulevard
- B-side: "Mainline Florida"
- Released: October 1974
- Recorded: 1974
- Genre: Blues, rock
- Length: 3:31
- Label: RSO
- Songwriter: Johnny Otis
- Producer: Tom Dowd

Eric Clapton singles chronology
"I Shot the Sheriff" (1974)	"Willie and the Hand Jive" (1974)	"Swing Low Sweet Chariot" (1975)

Official audio
- "Willie And The Hand Jive" on YouTube

"Willie and the Hand Jive" is a song written by Johnny Otis and originally released as a single in 1958 by Otis, reaching #9 on the Billboard Hot 100 chart and #5 on the Billboard R&B chart. The song has a Bo Diddley beat and was partly inspired by the music sung by a chain gang Otis heard while he was touring. The lyrics are about a man who became famous for doing a dance with his hands, but the song has been accused of glorifying masturbation, though Otis always denied it. It has since been covered by numerous artists, including The Crickets, The Strangeloves, Eric Clapton, Cliff Richard, Kim Carnes, George Thorogood, The Bunch, and in live performances by The Grateful Dead. Clapton's 1974 version was released as a single and reached the Billboard Hot 100, peaking at No. 26. Thorogood's 1985 version reached No. 25 on the Billboard Rock Tracks chart.

== Lyrics and music ==
The Johnny Otis original version of the song produced by Tom Morgan has an infectious Bo Diddley beat, similar to the hit "Bo Diddley" of Bo Diddley, much of it provided by drummer Earl Palmer. Johnny Otis biographer George Lipsitz describes Jimmy Nolen's guitar riff on the song as "unforgettable". The music was based on a song Otis had heard a chain gang singing while touring, combined with work Otis did as a teenager when he was performing with Count Otis Matthews and the West Oakland House Stompers.

The lyrics tell of a man named Willie who became famous for doing a hand jive dance. In a sense, the story is similar to that of Chuck Berry's "Johnny B. Goode", which tells of someone who became famous for playing the guitar and was released two months before "Willie and the Hand Jive". The origin of the song came when one of Otis' managers, Hal Ziegler, found out that rock'n'roll concert venues in England did not permit the teenagers to stand up and dance in the aisles, so they instead danced with their hands while remaining in their seats. At Otis' concerts, performers would demonstrate Willie's "hand jive" dance to the audience, so the audience could dance along. The dance consisted of clapping two fists together one on top of the other, followed by rolling the arms around each other. Otis' label, Capitol Records, also provided diagrams showing how to do the hand jive dance.

Despite the song's references to dancing, and despite the demonstrations of the dance during performances, would-be censors believed that the song was about masturbation. As recently as 1992, an interviewer for NPR asked Otis "Is 'Hand Jive' really about masturbation?" Otis was frustrated by this misinterpretation.

== Other versions ==
Cliff Richard recorded the song in 1960 and The Strangeloves included it on their 1965 album I Want Candy. The Youngbloods released a version of the song on their 1971 album, Good and Dusty. Johnny Rivers included the song on his 1973 album Blue Suede Shoes.

Eric Clapton recorded "Willie and the Hand Jive" for his 1974 album 461 Ocean Boulevard. Clapton slowed down the tempo for his version. Author Chris Welch believes that the song benefits from this "slow burn". Billboard described it as a "monster powerful cut" that retains elements from Clapton's previous single "I Shot the Sheriff." Record World said that "Clapton slowly boogies [the song] into laid-back magnificence." However, Rolling Stone critic Ken Emerson complains that the song sounds "disconcertingly mournful". Other critics praised Clapton's confident vocals. Author Marc Roberty claimed that on this song, "Eric's vocals had clearly matured, with fluctuations and intonations that were convincing rather than tentative as in the past." Clapton's version of the song was released as a single in 1974 and reached #26 on the Billboard Hot 100 and #28 in the Netherlands. It also reached #31 on the RPM magazine's top singles chart in Canada and peaked at #99 on the Oricon singles chart in Japan. Clapton included the song on his compilation album Time Pieces: Best of Eric Clapton. The single's B-side, George Terry's "Mainline Florida", was described as "breaking away from the established tone" of the album and features Clapton's using talk box during his outgoing solo. Clapton often played "Hand Jive" live, and it appeared on the live DVD One Night Only Live. Author Harry Shapiro said that the song could sound like "a dirge on bad nights but uplifting when the mood was right". Music author Dave Thompson claimed that Clapton's "live versions almost get you learning the [hand jive] movements all over again."

George Thorogood recorded a version of "Willie and the Hand Jive" for his 1985 album with the Destroyers, Maverick. His version was released as a single in June 1985. It charted on the Hot Mainstream Rock Tracks chart, peaking at #25, and reached #63 on the Billboard Hot 100 chart, making it Thorogood's only song to reach the chart. A music video was made for the song, which was produced at the Fifth Floor Productions in Cincinnati, Ohio, by Ellen Goldman and Maureen Arata. Allmusic critic James Christopher Monger called the song one of Thorogood's "high points."

Other artists who covered the song include: Johnny Rivers, New Riders of the Purple Sage, The Flying Burrito Brothers, Sandy Nelson, The Tremeloes, Amos Garrett, Ducks Deluxe and Levon Helm. Lee Michaels released a version of the song on his 1971 album, 5th. The Grateful Dead played "Willie and the Hand Jive" live several times in 1986 and 1987.

== Soundtracks ==
Footage from Otis' performance of "Willie and the Hand Jive" at the 1970 Monterey Jazz Festival was included in Clint Eastwood's 1971 film Play Misty for Me.

This song can be heard in the film The Shawshank Redemption.
