= Louis X. Erlanger =

American rock and roll and blues guitarist

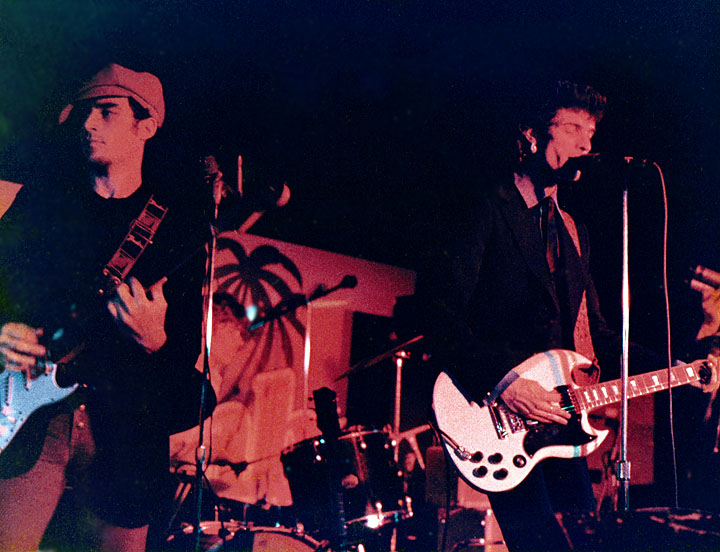
Erlanger (left) with Willy DeVille in 1977.

Louis X. Erlanger (born June 3, 1952) is an American rock and roll and blues guitarist best known for his work with the band Mink DeVille. Erlanger recorded three albums with the band: Cabretta (1977), Return to Magenta (1978), and Le Chat Bleu (1980). He also appeared on Live at CBGB's (1976), an album of bands that pioneered punk rock at the venerable nightclub CBGB in the mid-1970s.

Erlanger's first instrument was the piano, but he switched to guitar after hearing recordings by Jimmy Reed. In the summer of 1968, at the age of sixteen, he got a chance to back up John Lee Hooker at the Cafe Au Go Go in Greenwich Village (Hooker shared the bill with a young Van Morrison and the group Rhinoceros). Village Voice critic Annie Fisher described Hooker's performance as "awesome"; it was a turning point for Erlanger, who decided to become a professional musician. He formed a group called the Sting Rays, which had some success with an EP produced by Phil Schaap early in his career.

After leaving Mink DeVille, Erlanger returned to his first love, the blues, and worked with the likes of R. L. Burnside, Otis Rush, Pinetop Perkins, Hubert Sumlin, Big Jay McNeeley, and others. His Seattle-based group The Slamhound Hunters had a regional hit on the West Coast and toured Europe.

Erlanger produced two R.L. Burnside albums: Acoustic Stories (1997) and Well, Well, Well... (2001). Acoustic Stories was nominated for a W.C. Handy Award in 1998. Erlanger co-produced Down In The Delta with Muddy Waters Blues Band alumnus Paul Oscher, for which Oscher won an Acoustic Artist of the Year award and an Acoustic Album of the Year award at the 2006 Blues Music Awards. Erlanger also co-produced two subsequent Paul Oscher recordings: Bet On The Blues and Cool Cat. A video for Cool Cat involved a collaboration with the famous Youtube star Keyboard Cat. He also produced recordings by Ruth Brown bandleader and jazz organist Bobby Forrester, jazz guitarist William Ash, and Canadian Juno award winning singer Danny Brooks. Erlanger appears on the Robert Palmer-produced Fat Possum Records album by CeDell Davis entitled Feel Like Doin' Something Wrong (1994).

Two Erlanger songs appear on the soundtrack of the 1985 movie The Revenge of the Teenage Vixens from Outer Space.

Erlanger currently performs as Sunny Lowdown and has released three recordings under that name: The Blues Volume Low, Down Loaded, which was nominated for a 2018 Blues Blast Music Award as Acoustic Blues CD of The Year, and Shady Deal.
