= Cabretta =

Studio album by Mink DeVille
- Released: 1977
- Studio: A&R (New York); Capitol (Hollywood)
- Genre: R&B, rock, soul
- Length: 35:06
- Label: Capitol
- Producer: Jack Nitzsche

Mink DeVille chronology
Cabretta (1977)	Return to Magenta (1978)

Cabretta, known as Mink DeVille in the United States, was the 1977 debut album by Mink DeVille. It peaked at number 186 on the Billboard 200 chart and was voted the 29th best album of 1977 in the Village Voice's Pazz & Jop critics' poll. A single from the album, "Spanish Stroll", was a top-20 hit in the UK.

Cabretta was produced by Jack Nitzsche, who would help shape Mink DeVille's sound and collaborate with lead singer and composer Willy DeVille for many years to come. Joining the band on saxophone was Steve Douglas, who, like Nitzsche, is a member of the Rock and Roll Hall of Fame and who would also play on many Mink DeVille albums.

The album gets its name from a type of leather jacket (a Cabretta leather jacket was worn by Ben Edmonds, the Capitol Records A&R man who signed Mink DeVille in 1976). Willy DeVille said the Cabretta leather was like his band's music, tough but tender.

== Reception ==
Professional ratings
Review scores
Source	Rating
AllMusic	4.5/5 stars
Christgau's Record Guide	B

American Hit Network said of the album, "Under-promoted, under-appreciated and ultimately under-sold, Cabretta is a sleeper masterpiece that sounds as good today as it did in 1977." They added:

Like all truly great rock and roll, the songs mix fantasy and longing... "Venus of Avenue D" and "Spanish Stroll" find their romance in the street, and both walk that line between lust and longing, in the feeling of getting turned on by somebody. Willy DeVille’s character is tough as nails on the outside, but the hard surface doesn’t run deep enough to cover the heart that he wears on his sleeve. Even a casual listen to the album’s closing track, "Party Girls," makes this abundantly clear. DeVille’s a leather-jacketed romantic who looks so tough, but desperately wants the world to love him.

Trouser Press described the Mink DeVille of this era as follows:

On a good night in the New York underground around 1976 or 1977, the band led by Willy DeVille...could be the coolest cats on the scene. Willy dressed like a pimp and played a guitar covered in leopard skin; swagger and soulful strut was a brisk rejoinder to the sloppy punk and wimpy power pop bands they preceded and followed on stages. After the band was discovered, producer Jack Nitzsche got them on the lean, tough R&B beam for a first LP that sweats and smokes through and through as a classic of such fully and lovingly assimilated music should.

== Other information ==
"Little Girl" was recorded originally by the Crystals in 1964 under the title "Little Boy."

Willy DeVille said about the song "Mixed Up, Shook Up Girl": "I know Mick Jagger likes it. It's about a woman I know who was drug addict. She was mixed up and she was shook up. That's what it's about."

In liner notes to the 2001 compilation album Cadillac Walk: The Mink DeVille Collection, Ben Edmonds relates how Mick Jagger dropped by the Hollywood recording studio where Jack Nitzsche was producing Cabretta:

Jack had assisted on several Stones sessions, and it was his collaboration with Jagger on "Memo from Turner" that had me connect him with Mink DeVille in the first place. Jack put on a reel to show off his present work. Jagger listened to a couple of songs with polite disinterest, nodding approvingly to "Cadillac Walk." But when "Mixed Up, Shook Up Girl" came rolling out of the playback monitors, Jagger was immediately out of his seat and moving to its bittersweet mid-tempo rhythms. He danced with a grace one seldom sees in his herky-jerk stage performances, enveloped in the music and oblivious to the rest of us in the room... It couldn't have been more perfect if I'd dreamed it.

"Mixed Up, Shook Up Girl" is not a cover of the song of the same name by Patty & the Emblems.

Boz Scaggs covered "Mixed Up, Shook Up Girl" and "Cadillac Walk" on his 2013 album Memphis.

== Track listing ==
Unless otherwise noted, all songs by Willy DeVille.

1. "Venus of Avenue D" – 4:57
2. "Little Girl" (Jeff Barry, Ellie Greenwich, Phil Spector) – 4:19
3. "One Way Street" – 2:50
4. "Mixed up, Shook up Girl" – 3:44
5. "Gunslinger" – 2:09
6. "Can't Do Without It" – 3:15
7. "Cadillac Walk" (John Martin) – 3:14
8. "Spanish Stroll" – 3:38
9. "She's So Tough" – 2:30
10. "Party Girls" (Willy DeVille, Rubén Sigüenza) – 4:30

== Personnel ==
- Thomas R. "Manfred" Allen, Jr. – drums
- Willy DeVille – guitar, harmonica, vocals
- Steve Douglas – saxophone
- Louis X. Erlanger – guitar, background vocals
- The Immortals - background vocals
  - Max Bowman
  - Val Heron
  - Mike Johnson
- Bobby Leonards – piano, keyboards
- Allen Rabinowitz - background vocals
- Rubén Sigüenza – bass

=== Production ===
- Leland Bobbe – photographer
- Don Henderson – mixing assistant
- Eric Stephen Jacobs – photography
- Ray Janos – digital remastering
- Kim King – engineer
- Roy Kohara – art direction
- Jack Nitzsche – producer
- Art Sims – design
- Steve Wilson – reissue supervisor

== Charts ==
Chart (1978)	Peak position
Australia (Kent Music Report)	86
