= Return to Magenta =

Studio album by Mink DeVille
- Released: 1978
- Recorded: Columbia 30th Street (New York City); Sound Factory West (Hollywood, California)
- Genre: R&B, Rock, Soul, Blues
- Length: 30:43
- Label: Capitol
- Producer: Jack Nitzsche; Steve Douglas

Mink DeVille chronology
| Cabretta/Mink Deville (1977) | Return to Magenta (1978) | Le Chat Bleu (1980) |

Return to Magenta, issued in 1978, is the second album by the rock band Mink DeVille. The album was the last to feature all the original members of the band. For this album the band was joined by Rock and Roll Hall of Fame member Steve Douglas on sax and Dr. John on piano, who would later collaborate with leadsinger Willy DeVille after his move to New Orleans.

Return to Magenta continued in the vein of the first album, with a mixture of rock, soul, blues, and Latin rhythms. It was produced by Jack Nitzsche, who also co-wrote a song with DeVille ("Just Your Friends"). Willy DeVille said about Cabretta, Mink DeVille's album prior to Return to Magenta, "We went against strings on the first album — decided it should be outright, raw, and rude." On Return to Magenta, however, Willy DeVille and producers Jack Nitzsche and Steve Douglas employed lavish string arrangements on several songs.

Willy DeVille sings a quasi-duet with singer-songwriter David Forman on the Forman-composed “’A’ Train Lady.” "Steady Drivin' Man" became a favorite of Willy DeVille fans; DeVille performed the song on his Acoustic Trio Live in Berlin 25 years after the original recording.

== Reviews ==
Professional ratings
Review scores
| Source | Rating |
|---|---|
| AllMusic | 4/5 stars |
| Christgau's Record Guide | C+ |

Critic Robert Christgau gave the album a C+, writing, “The main thing wrong with Willie DeVille is that he hasn't had a new idea since he decided he didn't like acid in 1970. Even as the songpoet of greaser nostalgia, he's got nothing to say..." Many reviewers believed that Mink DeVille's second album sounded too much like its first, and the band had not broken new ground (although Kid Leo, musical director of WMMS in Cleveland, ranked it as the eighth best rock album of all time.) Return to Magenta peaked at 126 on Billboard's Pop Albums chart.

== Soundtracks ==
During the Return to Magenta recording sessions, the band recorded two songs for the background of Paul Schrader's Hardcore: "Easy Slider" and "Guardian Angel", three songs for the soundtrack of the movie Cruising: "Heat of the Moment", "Pullin' My String", and "It's So Easy." These songs were written by Willy DeVille and produced by Jack Nitzsche, who wrote the musical score for Cruising. The three songs appeared on the CD reissue of Willy DeVille's 1987 album Miracle. "It's So Easy" is also on the soundtrack of Quentin Tarantino's movie Grindhouse: Death Proof.

== Other information ==
The song "Rolene" was written by Moon Martin, who also wrote "Cadillac Walk," a song on Mink DeVille's previous album, Cabretta.

The album cover includes a quote (dated March 13, 1978) about the band by Rock and Roll Hall of Fame member Doc Pomus, who would later co-write songs with Willy DeVille:

Mink DeVille knows the truth of a city street and the courage in a ghetto love song. And the harsh reality in his voice and phrasing is yesterday, today, and tomorrow — timeless in the same way that loneliness, no money, and troubles find each other and never quit for a minute. But the fighters always have a shot at turning a corner, and if you holler loud enough, sometimes somebody hears you. And truth and love always separate the greats from the neverwases and neverwillbes.

DeVille said about the song "I Broke that Promise": "It's one of my favorite songs in that album. I keep it in the bag to do it. It has a good feeling because it says, 'I broke that promise that was so important to me.' You can say 'I broke that promise that was so important to you,' but it's even worse to break a promise that's only important to whoever made the promise."

Mink DeVille toured North America with Elvis Costello and Nick Lowe after this album came out.

Willy DeVille lived for a time on Boulevard de Magenta in Paris, which may account for the album's name, Return to Magenta."

Pianist Bobby Leonards said about Return to Magenta, "Willy had wanted to do an album much like the first one. He wanted to team up with Nitzsche to write some tunes, but Nitzsche wasn’t interested in doing that. All he wanted to do was produce. He was there to help. He didn’t actually say no. He said, 'Hey we’re wasting valuable time and you don’t have a lot of material. The record companies want you to produce a product every year, ten to twelve songs, but nobody writes that way. You do a record when you’ve got something. Don’t record unless you’re ready to record.'" He added, "I went back and erased most of my tracks, but some of mine are still on there.”

== Track listing ==
Unless otherwise noted, all songs by Willy DeVille.

1. “Guardian Angel” - 3:29
2. “Soul Twist” - 2:32
3. “’A’ Train Lady” (David Forman, David M. Levine) - 3:20
4. “Rolene” (John Martin) - 3:51
5. “Desperate Days” - 2:49
6. “Just Your Friends” (Willy DeVille, Jack Nitzsche) - 2:11
7. “Steady Drivin' Man” - 3:40
8. “Easy Slider” - 3:53
9. “I Broke That Promise” - 3:05
10. “Confidence to Kill” (Robert Aherns, Louis X. Erlanger) - 1:53

== Charts ==
| Chart (1978) | Peak position |
|---|---|
| Australia (Kent Music Report) | 76 |

== Personnel ==
- Thomas R. "Manfred" Allen, Jr. – drums
- Max & Bees - background vocals
- Willy DeVille – guitar, harmonica, vocals
- Mac Rebennack (Dr. John) – piano, 88s and reminiscent tonalities
- Cleon Douglas – background vocals
- Steve Douglas – saxophone
- Louis X. Erlanger – guitar, vocals
- David Forman – vocals, background vocals
- Jackie Kelso – saxophone
- Bobby Leonards – piano, keyboards
- Rubén Sigüenza – bass

=== Production ===
- Ken Anderson - design
- Steve Douglas – producer
- Mark Howlett - recording engineer, mixing
- Roy Kohara - art direction
- Duana Lemay - cover photo
- Brian D. McLaughlin - liner photos
- Jack Nitzsche - arranger, producer
- Ken Perry - mastering
- Larry "Lord Logar" Rosen - road
