= Where Angels Fear to Tread (Mink DeVille album) =

Studio album by Mink DeVille
- Released: 1983
- Recorded: Criteria, Miami
- Genre: Rock, soul, latin
- Length: 35:40
- Label: Atlantic
- Producer: Howard Albert, Ron Albert

Mink DeVille chronology
Coup de Grâce (1981)	Where Angels Fear to Tread (1983)	Sportin' Life (1985)

Where Angels Fear to Tread is the fifth studio album by the rock band Mink DeVille. It was released in 1983, and was the second album Mink DeVille recorded for Atlantic Records, and Atlantic brought in two in-house producers, Howard Albert and Ron Albert, to produce the album.

Mink DeVille as a rock group had effectively ceased to exist as a band; only lead singer Willy DeVille remained from the original band. For this album, Willy DeVille reached deeper into his Latin roots, even recording a salsa number, "Demasiado Corazon." A single, "Each Word's a Beat of My Heart," reached number 89 on the Billboard Hot 100 charts. Two percussionists from the Latin dance/disco band Foxy, Richie Puente and Joe Galdo, played on the album. A recording of "Stand by Me" was made at this session and released on a 7-inch single along with "Demasiado Corazon" and "Are You Lonely Tonight?"

== Reviews ==
Professional ratings
Review scores
Source	Rating
AllMusic	4/5 stars

Trouser Press said about the album, "This uncluttered and uncomplicated tribute to DeVille's chosen forebears — Sam Cooke, Phil Spector, the Drifters, Joe Tex, James Brown — also includes forays into Spanish Harlem and other wondrously nostalgic time warps. DeVille's songwriting and singing have returned to top strength, and the record burns with sincerity and warmth. Simply, elegantly excellent."

AllMusic said about Where Angels Fear to Tread, "DeVille and his band were burning through the pages of rock and R&B history (there are a couple of doo wop- and New Orleans-flavored cuts as well) with raw swagger and astonishing musicianship. Why they didn't catch on and George Thorogood did is a mystery that will be up to '80s historians to figure out."

== Other information ==
Boris Kinberg, a percussionist in The Mink DeVille Band, considered "Lilly's Daddy's Cadillac" one of the best songs Willy DeVille ever wrote. "It's a brilliant song. It's a mini-film. In a three-minute song you have an hour and a half movie. It's about drug deal gone bad."

Background singers Margaret Reynolds and Beverly Champion had sung with KC and the Sunshine Band and in 1985 would, under the name Margaret Reynolds and Girlfriends, record the Dubwise 12-inch single "Three Steps from True Love."

Willy DeVille recorded "The Moonlight Let Me Down" a second time in 1996 for a CD single. The single included a radio version and extended version of the song as well as "Ballad of the Hoodlum Priest" (from DeVille's Loup Garou).

The album's title comes from the Johnny Mercer song "Fools Rush In (Where Angels Fear to Tread)," not from the novel by that title written by E. M. Forster or "An Essay on Criticism" by Alexander Pope.

== Track listing ==
Unless otherwise noted, all songs by Willy DeVille.

1. "Each Word's a Beat of My Heart" - 3:24
2. "River of Tears" – 3:18
3. "Demasiado Corazon (Too Much Heart)" - 3:33
4. "Lilly's Daddy's Cadillac" - 2:52
5. "Around the Corner" (Ezio Leoni, Carl Sigman, Vito Pallavicini) - 2:30
6. "Pick Up the Pieces" - 3:20
7. "Love's Got a Hold on Me" - 4:33
8. "Keep Your Monkey Away from My Door" - 3:08
9. "Are You Lonely Tonight?" - 3:00
10. "The Moonlight Let Me Down" - 5:23

== Personnel ==
- Ricky Borgia – guitar, background vocals
- The C Lord C – background vocals
- Beverly Champion – background vocals
- Louis Cortelezzi – alto sax, baritone sax, tenor sax
- Willy DeVille – vocals, guitar, background vocals
- Joe Galdo – drums, percussion
- Kenny Margolis – piano, organ, accordion, synthesizer
- Richie Puente – percussion
- Margaret Reynolds – background vocals
- Joey Vasta – guitar
- Fred Wickstrom – percussion, timpani

Production

- Ron Albert - producer, mixing
- Howard Albert - producer, mixing
- Jay Berman - photography
- Willy DeVille - associate producer
- Joseph Fontana - executive producer
- Mike Fuller - mastering
- Patrice Carroll Levinsohn - assistant producer
- Louis Ragusa - executive producer
