= Jack Nitzsche =

American musician, composer, arranger (1937–2000)

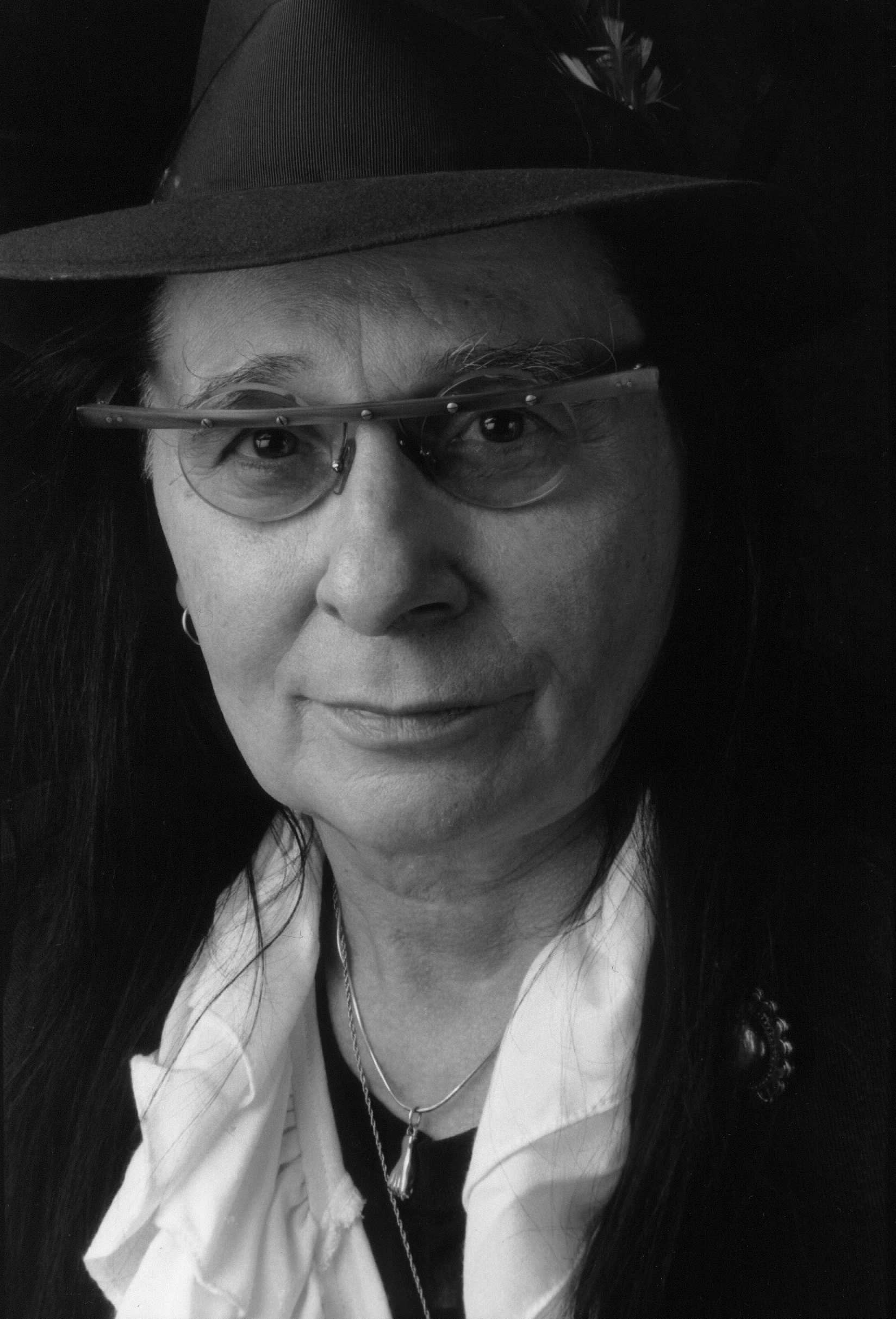

Background information
- Born: Bernard Alfred Nitzsche; April 22, 1937; Chicago, Illinois, U.S.
- Died: August 25, 2000 (aged 63) Los Angeles, California, U.S.
- Genres: Pop; rock; surf; classical; avant-garde
- Occupations: Composer; orchestrator; arranger; session musician; record producer
- Instruments: Piano; organ; vocals; saxophone
- Years active: 1955–1998
- Spouses: Gracia Ann May (m. 1959; div. 1978) Buffy Sainte-Marie (m. 1982; div. 1989)

Bernard Alfred "Jack" Nitzsche (/ˈniːtʃi/ NEECH-ee; April 22, 1937 – August 25, 2000) was an American musician, arranger, songwriter, composer, and record producer. He came to prominence in the early 1960s as the right-hand-man of producer Phil Spector, and went on to work with the Rolling Stones, Neil Young, and others. He worked extensively in film scores for the films Performance, The Exorcist and One Flew Over the Cuckoo's Nest. In 1983, he won the Academy Award for Best Original Song for co-writing "Up Where We Belong" with Buffy Sainte-Marie.

== Life and career ==
Nitzsche was born in Chicago and raised on a farm in Newaygo, Michigan, the son of German immigrants. He moved to Los Angeles in 1955 with ambitions of becoming a jazz saxophonist. He was hired by Sonny Bono, who was at the time an A&R executive at Specialty Records, as a music copyist. While there, Nitzsche wrote a novelty hit titled "Bongo Bongo Bongo". With Bono, Nitzsche wrote the song "Needles and Pins" for Jackie DeShannon, later recorded by the Searchers. His instrumental composition "The Lonely Surfer" entered the Cash Box top 100 on August 3, 1963, and reached No. 37.

He became arranger and conductor for producer Phil Spector, and orchestrated the Wall of Sound for almost all Spector's hits, perhaps best exemplified by "River Deep, Mountain High" by Ike and Tina Turner. Nitzsche worked with Earl Palmer, Leon Russell, Roy Caton, Glen Campbell, Carol Kaye and Hal Blaine in The Wrecking Crew, the backing band for many pop acts such as the Beach Boys and the Monkees. Nitzsche arranged the title song of Doris Day's film Move Over, Darling, which was a successful single on the pop charts of the time.

While organizing the music for the T.A.M.I. Show television special in 1964, he met the Rolling Stones and went on to play keyboards on their albums The Rolling Stones, Now! (The Rolling Stones No. 2 in the UK), Out of Our Heads, Aftermath and Between the Buttons as well as on their hit singles "Paint It, Black" and "Let's Spend the Night Together"; he also wrote the choral arrangements for "You Can't Always Get What You Want". In 1968 he introduced the band to slide guitarist Ry Cooder, a seminal influence on the band's 1969–1973 style.

On several Rolling Stones records, he was credited as player of the "Nitzsche-phone". In an obituary on Gadfly Online, former Rolling Stones manager Andrew Loog Oldham explained the credit:

I made that up for the credits on those Stones albums—it was just a regular piano (or maybe an organ) miked differently. It was all part of this package that was created around the Stones. People believed it existed. The idea was meant to be: "My god, they've had to invent new instruments to capture this new sound they hear in their brains." And they were inventing fresh sounds with old toys—therefore, it deserved to be highlighted—it was the read-up of creation, of imagination—getting credit for a job well done.

He collaborated with Neil Young, beginning with producing "Expecting to Fly" by Buffalo Springfield. In 1968, Nitzsche and Cooder co-produced Young's eponymous solo debut with David Briggs. As he was moving from baroque to folk and rock, Young hired Nitzsche for the Stray Gators, the session musicians behind Young on Harvest (1972) and Time Fades Away (1973).

With Crazy Horse in early 1970, Nitzsche played electric piano and, on the studio recording of "When You Dance, I Can Really Love", acoustic piano. Despite frequent clashes with Billy Talbot and Ralph Molina, Nitzsche remained with the band after Young left in 1970. Nitzsche co-produced the band's 1971 self-titled debut album and sang lead vocal on "Crow Jane Lady". He left Crazy Horse after the album's commercial failure.

While remaining prolific throughout the 1970s, he began to suffer from depression and problems connected to substance abuse. His relationship with Young began to deteriorate during the 1973 support tour for Harvest that yielded Time Fades Away. During rehearsals, drummer Kenny Buttrey demanded a salary of $100,000 to compensate for lost session work, leading Nitzsche (with support from bassist Tim Drummond) to prevail upon Young to extend this salary to the other band members. Although Young reluctantly agreed, Nitzsche thought Young never got over it. Nitzsche frequently spewed obscenities into his vocal mike (leading Young's sound engineers to disconnect it) and often quarreled with David Crosby, who joined the tour's final dates to assist with vocal harmonies. After he publicly castigated Young in a 1974 interview, the two men became estranged for several years and collaborated only sporadically. Later that year, he was dropped from the Reprise roster after recording a song criticizing executive Mo Ostin. This period culminated in his arrest for allegedly breaking into the home of and then raping ex-girlfriend Carrie Snodgress, formerly Young's companion, with a gun barrel on June 29, 1979. Snodgress was treated at the hospital for a bone fracture, cuts and bruises and had 18 stitches. The charge of rape by instrumentation (which carries a five-year sentence) was dismissed.

In 1979, Nitzsche produced Graham Parker's album Squeezing Out Sparks. Nitzsche produced three Mink DeVille albums beginning in the late 1970s: Cabretta (1977), Return to Magenta (1978) and Coup de Grâce (1981). Nitzsche said DeVille was the best singer he had ever worked with.

Nitzsche began to concentrate more on film music rather than pop music in the mid-1970s, becoming one of the more prolific film orchestrators in Hollywood during the period. In 1983, he received the Academy Award for Best Song for co-writing "Up Where We Belong" (from the 1982 film An Officer and a Gentleman) with Will Jennings and Buffy Sainte-Marie. Nitzsche had also worked on film scores throughout his career, such as his contributions to the Monkees movie Head, the theme music from Village of the Giants (recycling an earlier single, "The Last Race") and the soundtracks for Performance (1970), The Exorcist (1973), One Flew Over the Cuckoo's Nest (1975), Hardcore (1979), The Razor's Edge (1984) and Starman (also 1984). He was nominated for the Academy Award for Best Original Score and a Grammy for his contributions to One Flew Over the Cuckoo's Nest, his first of many studio projects with Scott Mathews.

In the mid-1990s, an inebriated Nitzsche was seen being arrested in Hollywood in an episode of the television show Cops after brandishing a gun at some youths who had stolen his hat. Attempting to explain himself to the arresting officers, he is heard exclaiming that he was an Academy Award winner. In 1997, he expressed interest in producing a comeback album for Link Wray, although this never materialized due to their mutually declining health.

In 2000, Nitzsche planned to work with Mercury Rev on All Is Dream. Nitzsche intended to produce and orchestrate the record, having praised the band's 1998 album Deserter's Songs, but he died before pre-production.

== Personal life ==
Nitzsche met his first wife, singer Gracia Ann May, while he was working for Capitol Records. May would later join the Blossoms. His second wife was Buffy Sainte-Marie, with whom he co-wrote the Academy Award winning song for 1982, "Up Where We Belong". Married on March 19, 1982; they were married for seven years.

He also had a relationship with actress Carrie Snodgress, who was previously in a relationship with Neil Young. In 1979, Nitzsche was charged with threatening to kill her after he barged into her home and beat her with a handgun. He pleaded guilty to threatening her, was fined, and placed on three years' probation.

Nitzsche suffered a stroke in 1998 which ended his career. He died in Hollywood's Queen of Angels – Hollywood Presbyterian Medical Center in 2000 of cardiac arrest brought on by a recurring bronchial infection. His interment was at Hollywood Forever Cemetery. He was survived by one son.

== Discography ==
=== Studio albums ===
- The Lonely Surfer (Reprise, 1963)
- Dance to the Hits of the Beatles (Reprise, 1964)
- Chopin '66 (Reprise, 1966)
- St. Giles Cripplegate (Reprise, 1972)

=== Soundtrack albums ===
- Blue Collar (Music from the Original Motion Picture) (MCA, 1978)
- The Razor's Edge (Original Motion Picture Soundtrack) (Southern Cross, 1984)
- The Hot Spot (Original Motion Picture Soundtrack) (Island, 1990)
- The Indian Runner (Original Motion Picture Soundtrack) with David Lindley (Capitol, 1991)
- Revenge (Original Film Soundtrack) (Silva America, 1995)

=== With Crazy Horse ===
- Crazy Horse (Reprise, 1971)

=== With the Rolling Stones ===
- The Rolling Stones No. 2 (Decca, 1965)
- Out of Our Heads (Decca, 1965)
- Aftermath (Decca, 1966)
- Between the Buttons (Decca, 1967)
- Let It Bleed [Decca (UK), London (US), 1969] (arranger only)
- Sticky Fingers (Rolling Stones, 1971)
- Emotional Rescue (Rolling Stones, 1980) (arranger only)

=== With Neil Young ===
- "Expecting to Fly" (from the Buffalo Springfield album Buffalo Springfield Again, Atco, 1967)
- Neil Young (Reprise, 1968)
- After the Gold Rush (Reprise, 1970)
- Harvest (Reprise, 1972)
- Time Fades Away (Reprise, 1973)
- Tonight's the Night (Reprise, 1975)
- Life (Geffen, 1987)
- Harvest Moon (Reprise, 1992) (arranger only)
- Live at the Fillmore East (Reprise, 2006, recorded 1970)
- "Cinnamon Girl" (live at the Fillmore East – March 7, 1970) (download-only single) (Reprise, 2009, recorded 1970)
- Tuscaloosa (Reprise, 2019, recorded 1973)

=== Box sets ===
- The Archives Vol. 1 1963–1972 (Reprise, 2009)
- Neil Young Archives Volume II: 1972–1976 (Reprise, 2020)

== Filmography ==
| Year | Title | Dir. | Notes |
|---|---|---|---|
| 1962 | Girls! Girls! Girls! | Norman Taurog | Piano player lounge band (uncredited) |
| 1965 | Village of the Giants | Bert I. Gordon | with The Beau Brummels |
| 1970 | Performance | Donald Cammell; Nicolas Roeg | with Jagger/Richards |
| 1972 | Greaser's Palace | Robert Downey Sr. | |
| 1973 | Sticks and Bones | Robert Downey Sr. | Television film |
| 1973 | The Exorcist | William Friedkin | with Mike Oldfield |
| 1975 | One Flew Over the Cuckoo's Nest | Miloš Forman | Nominated – Academy Award for Best Original Score; Nominated – Grammy Award for Best Score Soundtrack for Visual Media |
| 1977 | Heroes | Jeremy Kagan | |
| 1978 | Blue Collar | Paul Schrader | Nominated – Los Angeles Film Critics Association Award for Best Music |
| 1979 | Hardcore | Paul Schrader | |
| 1979 | When You Comin' Back, Red Ryder? | Milton Katselas | |
| 1980 | Cruising | William Friedkin | with Germs Nominated – Stinkers Bad Movie Award for Most Intrusive Musical Score |
| 1980 | Heart Beat | John Byrum | |
| 1981 | Cutter's Way | Ivan Passer | |
| 1982 | Personal Best | Robert Towne | with Jill Fraser |
| 1982 | Cannery Row | David S. Ward | |
| 1982 | An Officer and a Gentleman | Taylor Hackford | Academy Award for Best Original Song; Golden Globe Award for Best Original Song; BAFTA Award for Best Original Song; Nominated – Academy Award for Best Original Score; Nominated – BAFTA Award for Best Film Music |
| 1983 | Without a Trace | Stanley R. Jaffe | |
| 1983 | Breathless | Jim McBride | |
| 1984 | Windy City | Armyan Bernstein | |
| 1984 | The Razor's Edge | John Byrum | |
| 1984 | Starman | John Carpenter | Nominated for: Golden Globe Award for Best Original Score |
| 1985 | Stripper | Jerome Gray | Documentary film |
| 1985 | The Jewel of the Nile | Lewis Teague | |
| 1986 | 9½ Weeks | Adrian Lyne | |
| 1986 | Stand by Me | Rob Reiner | |
| 1986 | The Whoopee Boys | John Byrum | with Udi Harpaz |
| 1986 | Streets of Gold | Joe Roth | |
| 1988 | The Seventh Sign | Carl Schultz | |
| 1989 | Next of Kin | John Irvin | |
| 1990 | The Last of the Finest | John Mackenzie | with Michael Hoenig & Mick Taylor |
| 1990 | Revenge | Tony Scott | |
| 1990 | The Hot Spot | Dennis Hopper | |
| 1990 | Mermaids | Richard Benjamin | |
| 1991 | The Indian Runner | Sean Penn | |
| 1994 | Blue Sky | Tony Richardson | |
| 1995 | The Crossing Guard | Sean Penn | |
