= Alex Halberstadt =

American writer

Alex Halberstadt is an American nonfiction writer and journalist.

He grew up in Moscow and in 1980 came to the United States, where he and his family settled in New York City. He attended Stuyvesant High School, Oberlin College and Columbia University.

== Career ==
Halberstadt’s writing has appeared in The New York Times Magazine, The New Yorker, The New York Times Book Review, GQ, Travel + Leisure, Saveur, Food & Wine, New York Magazine, Grand Street, The Washington Post, Lucky Peach, The Paris Review, and elsewhere.

Young Heroes of the Soviet Union, his family memoir, was named a New York Times Critics’ Top Book of 2020, a New York Times Book Review Editor's Choice, and was excerpted in The New Yorker. Writing in The New York Times, critic Jennifer Szalai called it "a loving and mournful account that’s also skeptical, surprising and often very funny," adding, "it’s the unexpected specificity of Halberstadt’s observations that ultimately make this memoir as lush and moving as it is.“

Halberstadt's critically acclaimed biography, Lonely Avenue: the Unlikely Life and Times of Doc Pomus, was named a New York Times Book Review Editor's Choice and a Best Book of 2007 by The Times (London). Ben Folds and Nick Hornby cited it as an inspiration for their collaborative album Lonely Avenue.

Halberstadt’s magazine writing was anthologized in Best Food Writing 2014 and Best American Food Writing 2018. In 2013, 2014, and 2024 he was nominated for a James Beard Award, and he appeared at the 2013 New Yorker Festival. He has received fellowships from The MacDowell Colony, Yaddo, and Art OMI at Ledig House. He teaches at New York University.

== Bibliography ==
=== Books ===
Lonely Avenue: the Unlikely Life and Times of Doc Pomus. Da Capo Press. 2007.

Young Heroes of the Soviet Union Random House. 2020.

=== Essays and reporting ===
- "The Motorcycle Diarist". New York Magazine. November 25, 2007.
- "'Cooking Isn't Creative, and It Isn't Easy'". The New York Times Magazine. October 11, 2012.
- "The Transformational Power of the Right Spice". The New York Times Magazine. April 4, 2013.
- "Next Stage: Kim Gordon Goes Solo". The New Yorker. June 3, 2013.
- "Steven Grasse: Punk-Rock Prince of Small-Batch Spirits". Food & Wine. October 3, 2013. Archived from the original on June 25, 2018.
- "Dominique Ansel: The Leading Light of Pastry". Food & Wine. January 16, 2014.
- "Zoo Animals and Their Discontents". The New York Times Magazine. July 3, 2014.
- "A Prisoner's Reading List". The New Yorker. July 7, 2014.
- "Out of the Woods". The New York Times Magazine. August 6, 2015.
- "Letter of Recommendation: Cheddar and Sour Cream Ruffles". The New York Times Magazine. August 17, 2016.
- "Can Kyoto's Buddhist Cuisine Teach Us All To Eat Better?". Saveur. November 29, 2017.
- "Letter of Recommendation: Rodney Dangerfield". The New York Times Magazine. January 26, 2018.
- "October's Child: The Year I Left the Soviet Union". The New Yorker. April 5, 2020.
- "Unforeseen Calamities". MoMA Magazine. May 22, 2020.
